= Myxomycota =

Myxomycota is a term used to refer to some fungus-like amoebozoa:

- Infraphylum Mycetozoa (which encompasses Myxogastria among other classes)
- Class Myxogastria alone

== See also ==
- Wikispecies:Fungi (classifications)
