= AmoebaDB =

Content
- Description: functional genomic resources for Amoebozoa
- Organisms: amoebozoa

Contact
- Research center: National Institute of Allergy and Infectious Diseases
- Laboratory: Center for Tropical and Emerging Global Diseases, University of Georgia
- Primary citation: PMID 20974635
- Release date: 2010

Access
- Website: amoebadb.org

AmoebaDB is a functional genomics database for the genetics of amoebozoa.

== See also ==
- Amoebozoa
