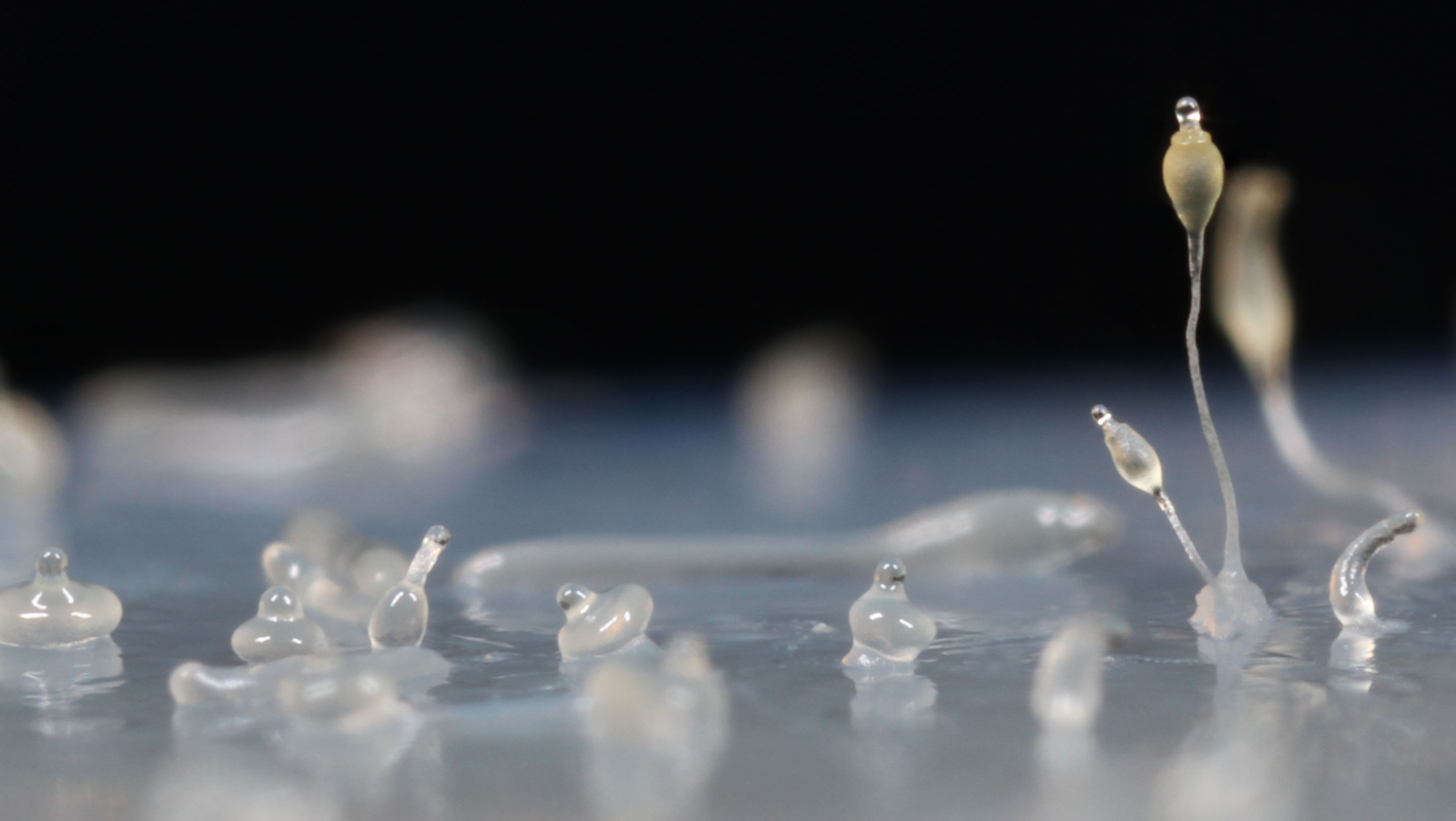
- Dictyostelium discoideum

Scientific classification
- Domain: Eukaryota
- Phylum: Amoebozoa
- Clade: Evosea; Kang et al. 2017

Clades
- Cutosea; Conosa; Archamoebae; Eumycetozoa; Variosea

Synonyms
- Conosa Cavalier-Smith 1998, emend. stat. n. 2022

= Evosea =

Group of amoebae

Evosea is a diverse clade of amoeboid protists discovered through molecular analyses. Along with Tubulinea and Discosea, Evosea is one of the three major groups within Amoebozoa, an important clade of eukaryotic organisms. It contains unicellular organisms that display a wide variety of life cycles and cell shapes, including amoebae, flagellates and different kinds of slime molds.

== Characteristics ==
Evosea is a strongly supported clade of eukaryotes containing four large groups of amoebozoans: Eumycetozoa or "true" slime molds, Variosea, Cutosea and Archamoebae. It is defined on a node-based approach as the least-inclusive clade containing Dictyostelium discoideum (a true slime mold), Protostelium nocturnum (a variosean), Squamamoeba japonica (a cutosean), and Entamoeba histolytica (an archamoeba).

Within Evosea, organisms can vary across almost the entire range of morphologies seen in Amoebozoa. Many members have complex life cycles that include amoebae, flagellates and fruiting stages. Some species appear to be exclusively flagellates, with no amoeboid features.

== Taxonomy ==
Evosea is a clade discovered in 2017 through a phylogenomic study by Senghuo Kang and coauthors, published in the journal Molecular Biology and Evolution. Since its discovery, it has been supported by independent analyses. As of 2019, it is accepted by the International Society of Protistologists as part of the modern cladistic classification of eukaryotes. The name 'Evosea' is partly an acronym of the major members of the clade: Eumycetozoa (E), Variosea (v), Squamamoebidae and Sapocribridae (s), and Archamoebae (a).

- Amoebozoa Lühe 1913, sensu Cavalier-Smith 1998
  - Evosea Kang et al. 2017
    - Cutosea Cavalier-Smith et al. 2016
      - Idionectidae Hess and Simpson, 2019
      - Squamamoebidae Cavalier-Smith et al. 2016
      - Sapocribridae Cavalier-Smith et al. 2016
    - Conosa Cavalier-Smith 1998
      - Variosea Cavalier-Smith et al. 2004
      - Eumycetozoa Zopf 1884 sensu Kang et al. 2017
      - Archamoebea Cavalier-Smith 1983, sensu Cavalier-Smith et al. 2004

== Evolution ==
Evosea is composed of two sister clades: Cutosea, a small group of solitary amoebae, and Conosa, a larger group that contains the archamoebae, true slime molds and Variosea. Evosea, along with Tubulinea and Discosea, compose the entirety of Amoebozoa. The branching order of these three basal groups is still unresolved: either Evosea groups with Tubulinea (in a clade known as Tevosa), or with Discosea (in a clade called Divosa). The following cladogram is based on a 2022 analysis, which resulted in the Divosa hypothesis:

- Amorphea
  - Amoebozoa
    - Tubulinea
    - - Discosea
      - Evosea
        - Cutosea
          - Squamamoebidae
          - Sapocribridae
        - Conosa
          - - Archamoebae
            - Eumycetozoa
          - Variosea
  - Obazoa
