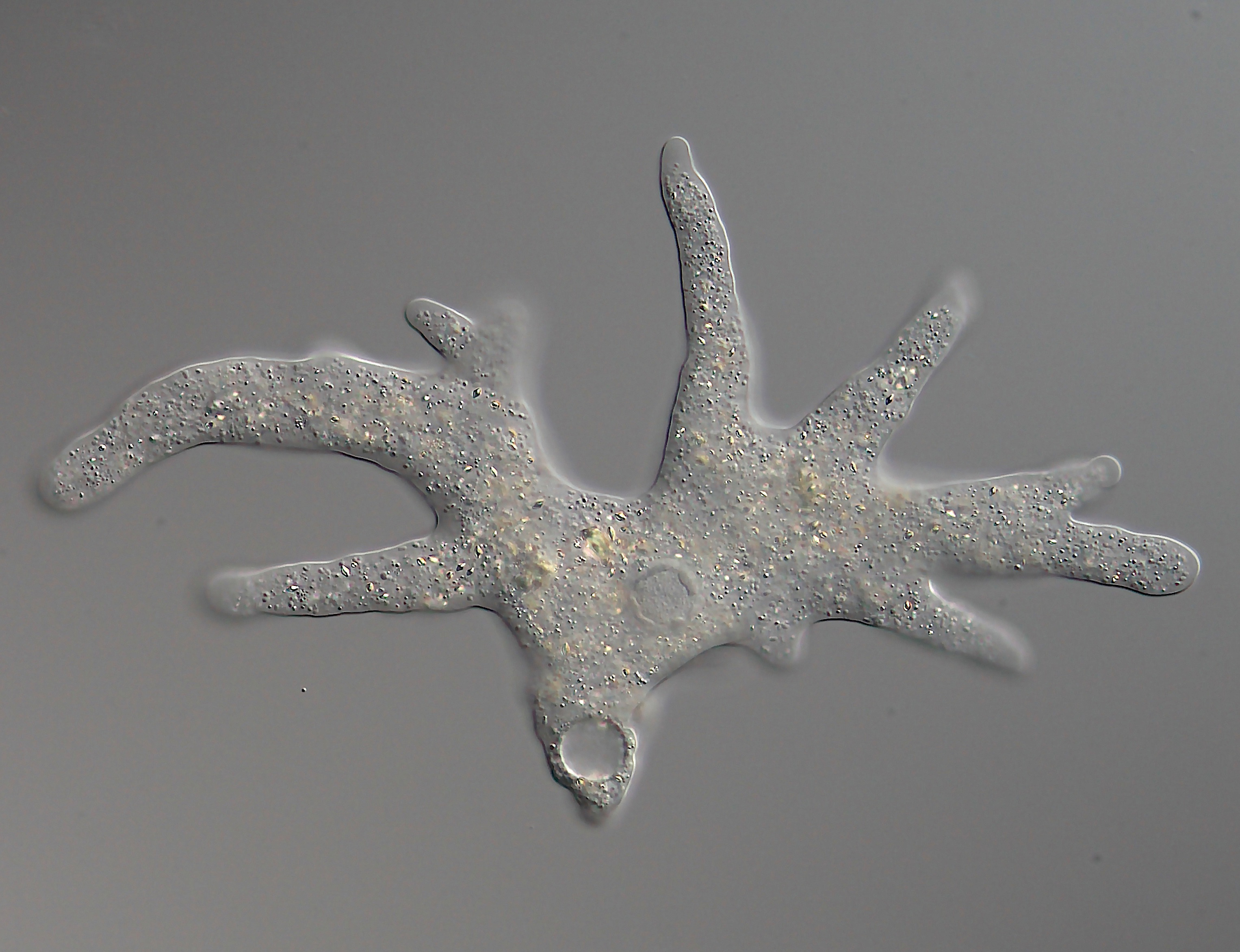
- Amoeba proteus (Tubulinea)

Scientific classification (disputed)
- Domain: Eukaryota
- Clade: Amorphea
- Phylum: Amoebozoa
- Subphylum: Lobosa; Carpenter, 1861, em. Cavalier-Smith, 2009

Groups included
- Discosea; Tubulinea; Cutosea

Cladistically included but traditionally excluded taxa
- Conosa

= Lobosa =

Phylum of protozoans

Lobosa is a taxonomic group of amoebae in the phylum Amoebozoa. Most lobosans possess broad, bluntly rounded pseudopods, although one genus in the group, the recently discovered Sapocribrum, has slender and threadlike (filose) pseudopodia. In current classification schemes, Lobosa is a subphylum, composed mainly of amoebae that have lobose pseudopods but lack cilia or flagella.

== Characteristics ==
The group was originally proposed in 1861 by William B. Carpenter, who created it as a taxonomic order containing the single family Amoebina. Carpenter's Lobosa consisted of amoeboid organisms whose endoplasm (endosarc) flows into lobe-like "pseudopodian prolongations." This type of pseudopod, which was understood to be typical of the genus Amoeba "and its allies," differed from the filose (thread-like) or reticulose (netlike) pseudopods of the Foraminifera. The name Lobosa was chosen for these amoebae "as expressing the lobe-like character of their pseudopodial extensions".

As currently defined, the subphylum Lobosa includes both shelled (testate) and naked amoebae (gymnamoebae), but excludes some organisms traditionally regarded as "lobosean", such as Pelomyxa and Entamoeba (Amoebozoa) and some Heterolobosea (Excavata).

== Phylogeny ==
The subphylum Lobosa is paraphyletic, consisting of a grade of three clades: Discosea, Tubulinea and Cutosea. The first two are part of a paraphyletic superclass Glycopoda, while the latter constitutes the monophyletic superclass Cutosa. The clade uniting Tubulinea + Cutosea + Conosa is named Tevosa, while the clade uniting Cutosa + Conosa is named Evosea.

- Amoebozoa
  - Discosea
    - Flabellinia
    - Centramoebia
  - Tevosa
    - Tubulinea
      - Corycidia
      - - Echinamoebia
        - Elardia
    - Evosea
      - Cutosea
      - Conosa
        - Archamoebea
        - Semiconosia
          - Variosea
          - Mycetozoa
            - Dictyostelea
            - - Ceratiomyxea
              - Myxogastrea
- Opisthokonta

== Gallery ==
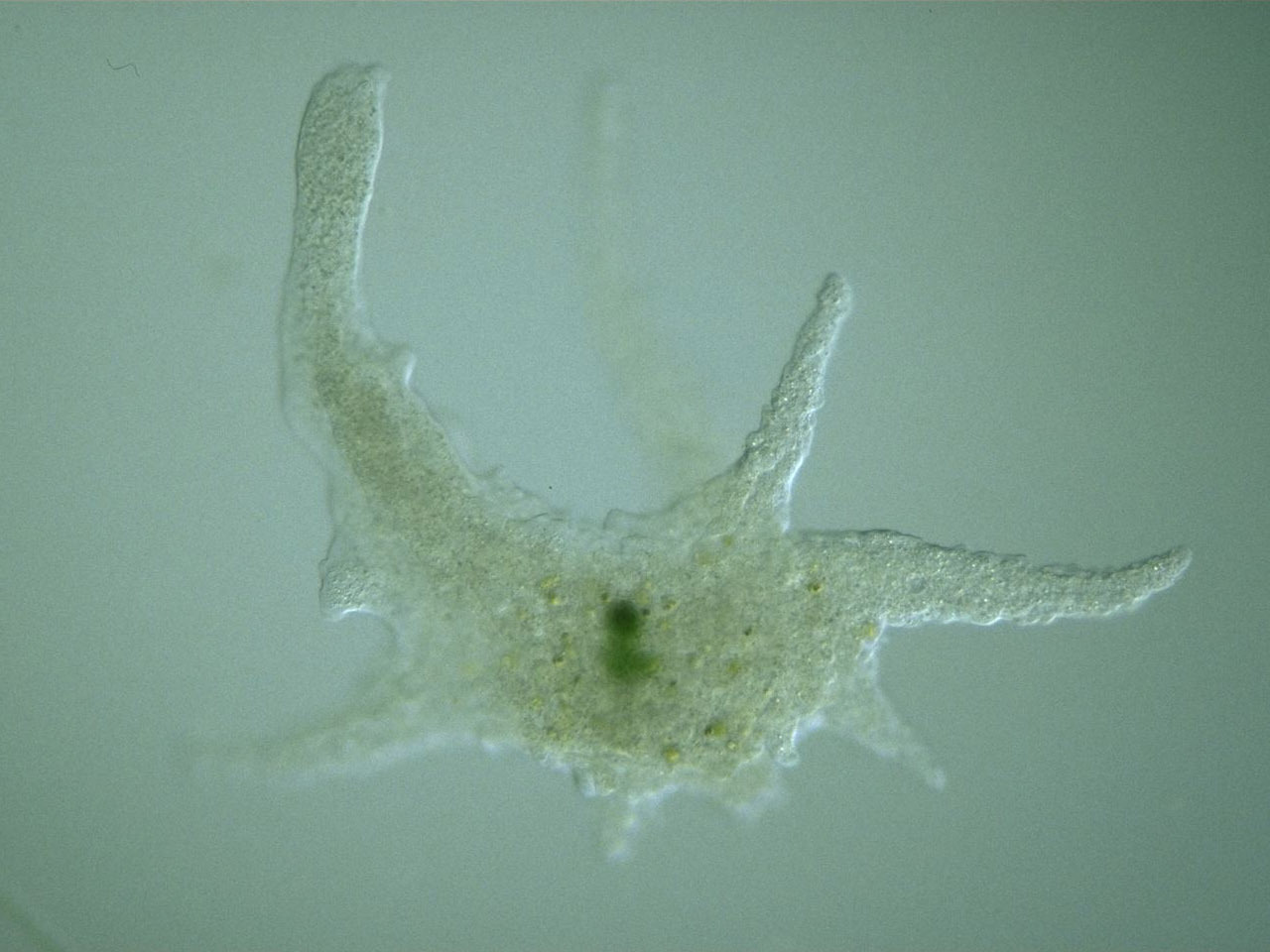
Chaos carolinensis (Tubulinea)

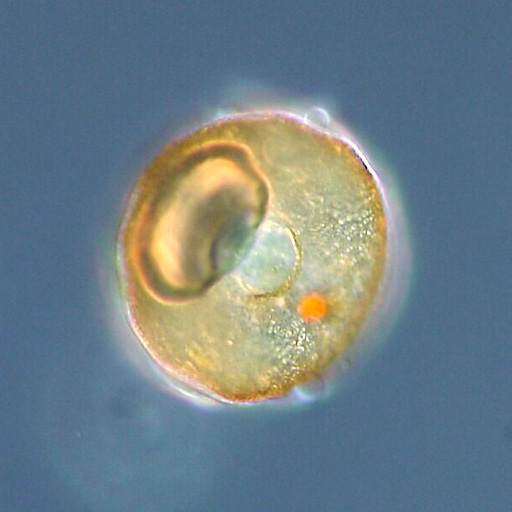
Arcella sp. test (Tubulinea)

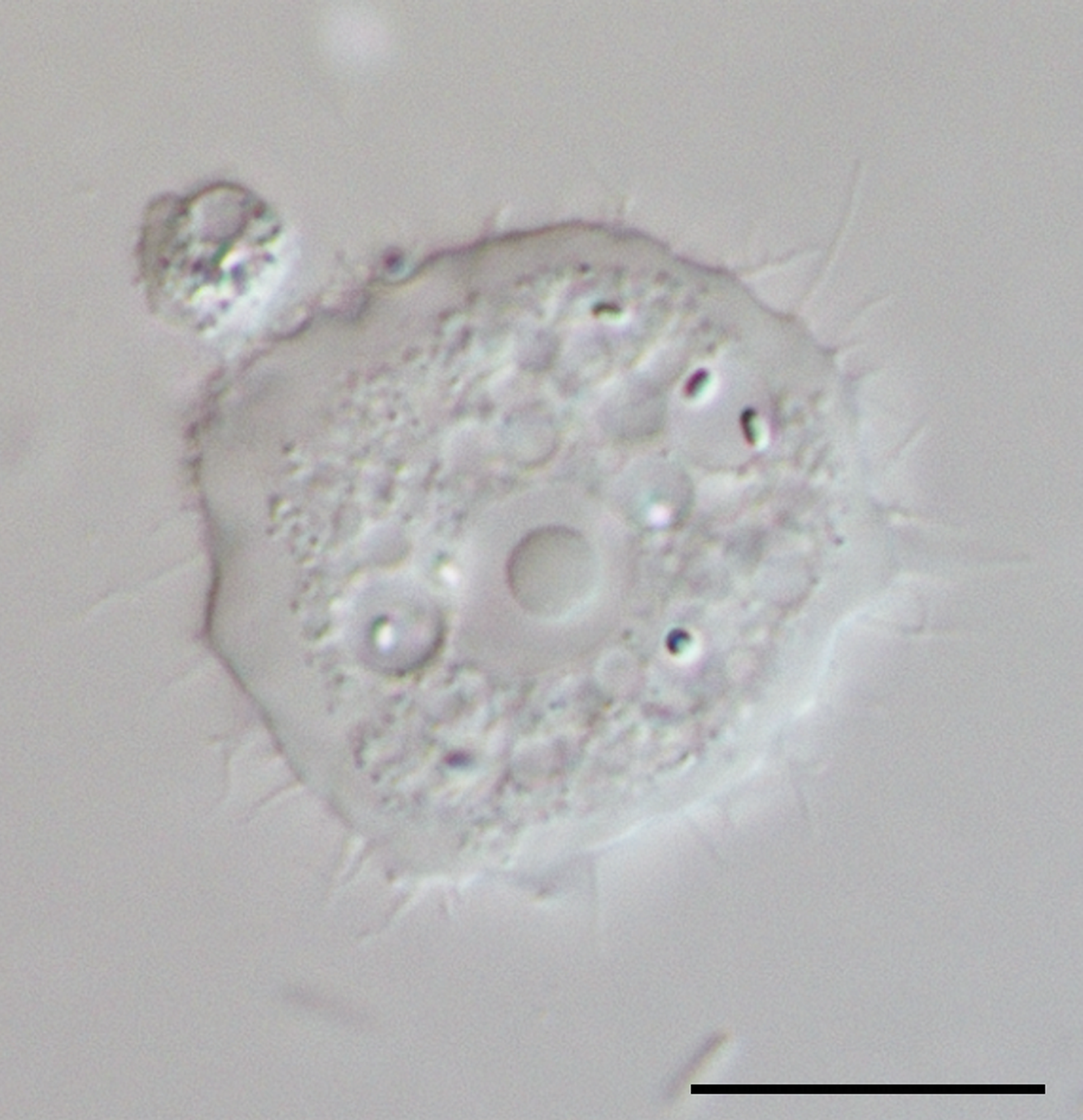
Acanthamoeba sp. (Discosea)

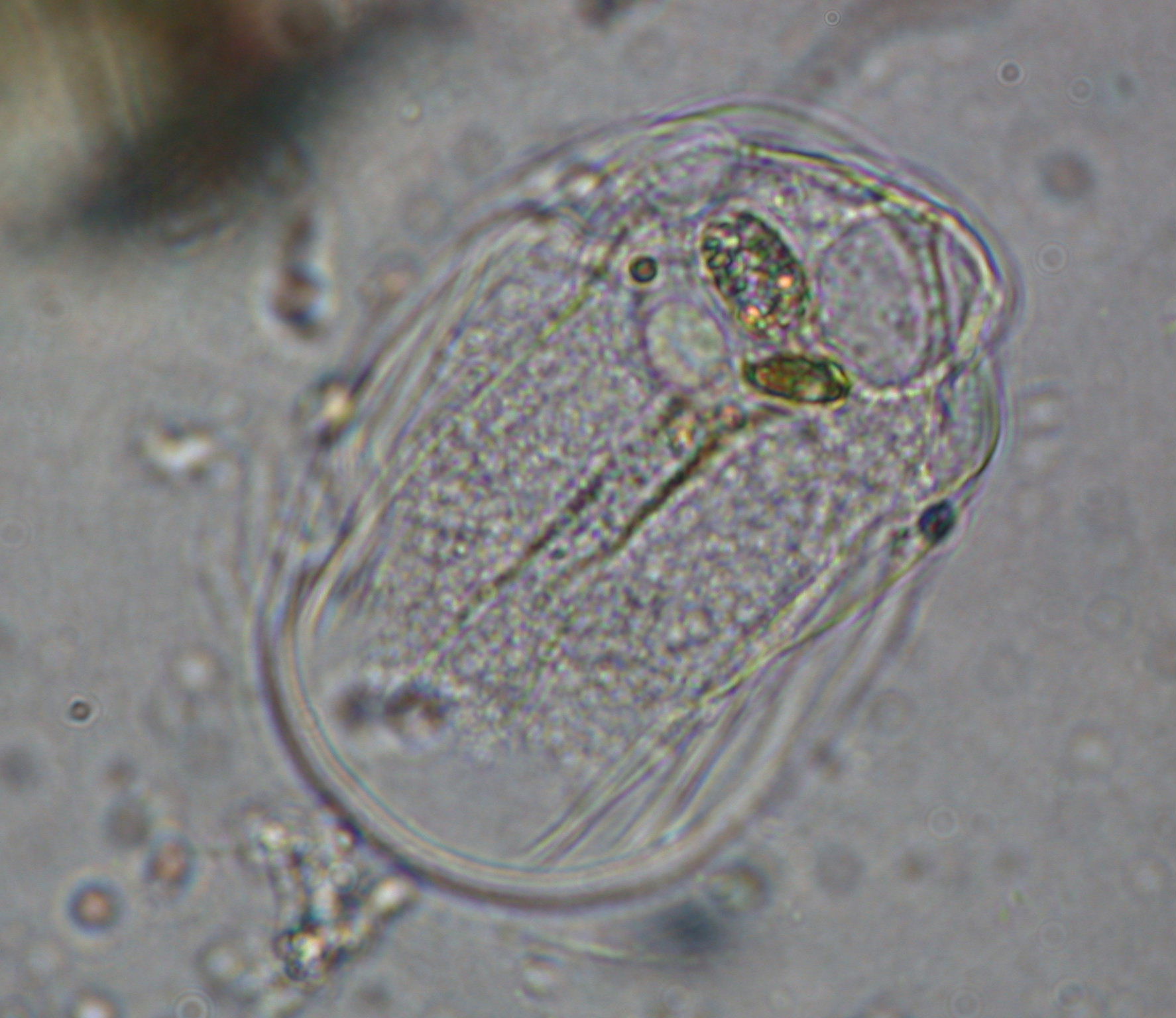
Thecamoeba sp. (Discosea)
