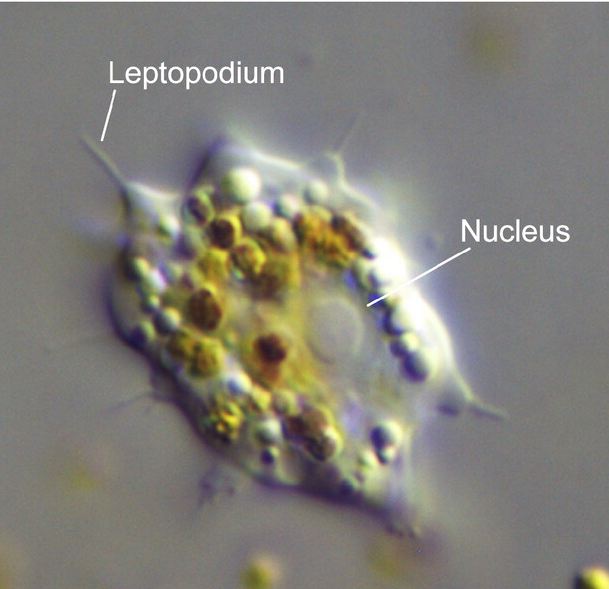
- Idionectes vortex amoeboid form

Scientific classification
- Domain: Eukaryota
- Phylum: Amoebozoa
- Class: Cutosea
- Order: Squamocutida
- Family: Idionectidae; Hess & Simpson, 2019
- Genus: Idionectes; Hess & Simpson, 2019
- Species: I. vortex

Binomial name
- Idionectes vortex Hess & Simpson, 2019

= Idionectes =

Species of amoeba

Idionectes is a genus of amoeba discovered from Allensbach, Konstanz, Germany. It contains only one species, I. vortex. Described by Sebastian Hess and Alastair G. B. Simpson in 2019, the scientific name means distinct or peculiar swimmer. Named because of its unique locomotion by creating a water vortex with its flying saucer-like body, it was also dubbed UFO (for unidentified flagellate organism). It is the only known eukaryotic cell having a rotating flagellum, which is the usual characteristic of prokaryotes.

== Discovery ==
Sebastian Hess, a zoology student at the University of Cologne, had been studying microbes from the Sphagnum ponds of the Simmelried in Allensbach, Konstanz, Germany. The location has been recognised as a microbial biodiversity hotspot. In 2010, Hess collected unusual microbes which were unknown at the time. As he observed the water samples under a microscope, he saw green algae which appeared to contain additional cells inside their filaments. After few days he saw that the hidden cells came out of the algae and swim in the water, and then invade fresh algae. As an unknown amoeba, they nicknamed it UFO (for an "unidentified flagellate organism").

Hess continued to study the UFOs during his postdoctoral research at Dalhousie University, Nova Scotia, Canada. With the help of his Dalhousie colleagues Laura Eme, Andrew J. Roger and Alastair G. B. Simpson, he was able to genetically find out that the organism was a type of amoeba. Specifically, the unusual cells were parasitoid amoeboflagellates that swim with peculiar motion, they rotate perpendicular to the direction of movement unlike other eukaryotic flagellates and looked like tiny flying saucers. In 2019, the team made the formal description in Nature Microbiology and gave the scientific name Idionectes vortex, meaning distinct or peculiar swimmer in vortex.

== Structure ==
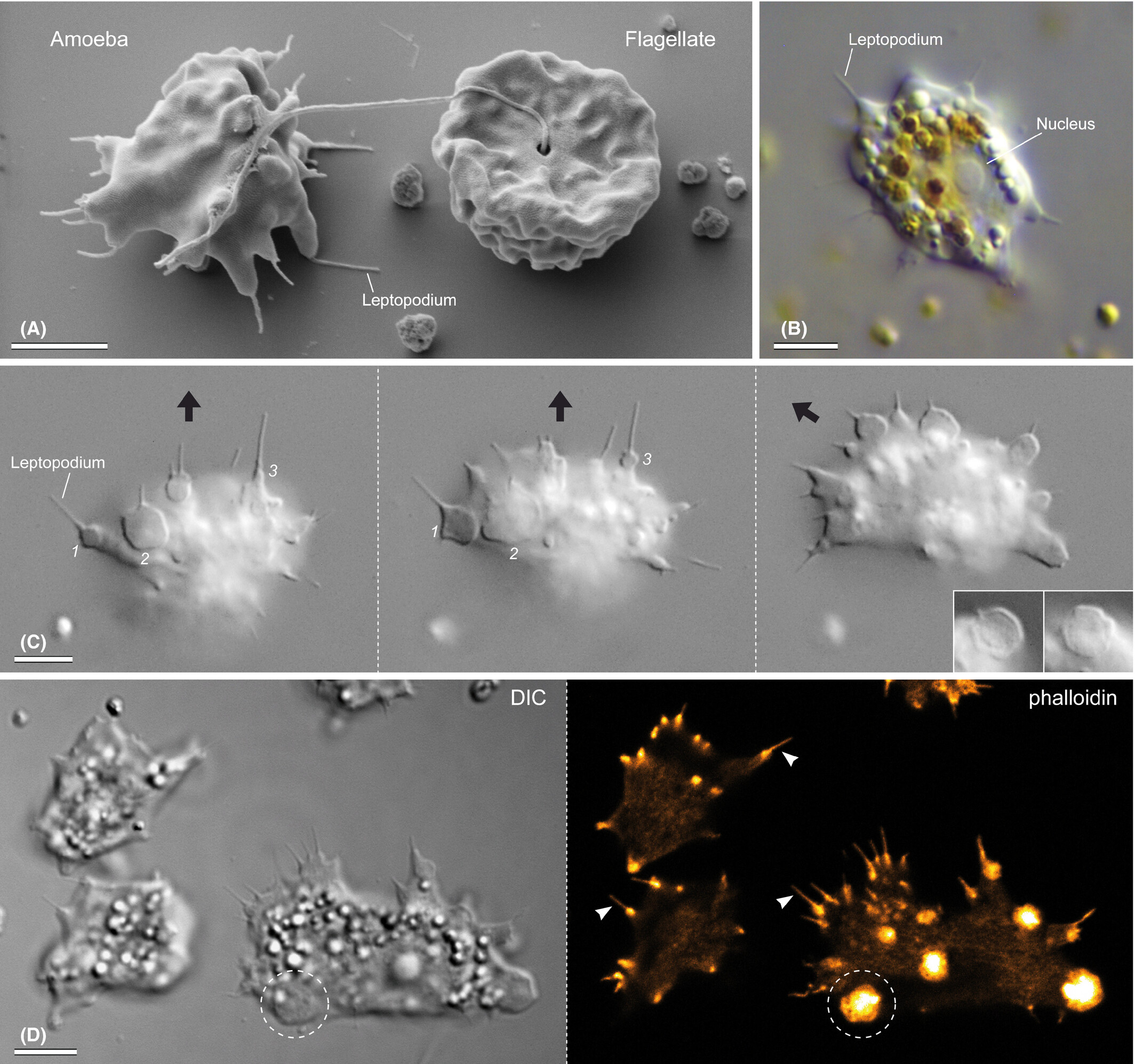
(A) Idionectes vortex amoeboid cell (left) and flagellate (right). (B) An amoeboid cell with leptopodia, nucleus, and food inclusions. (C) Time series of locomoting amoeba. (D) Three amoebae showing the distribution of F-actin (phalloidin) in leptopodia (arrowheads) and adhesion zones (dashed circles). Scale bars: 5 μm

Idionectes is a unicellular protist that lives in water. Its main cell body is rounded like a blob, radially symmetrical, with a conical side and a flat base, which is an adhesion zone to algal cells. This appearance makes an impression of a flying saucer. It measures about 15 μm long and 8 μm broad. It contains a single nucleus and a basal body. The nucleus is about 4 μm in diameter. The cell membrane is covered with scales and is highly flexible. The external scales are boat shaped, each measuring 150 nm long and 70 nm wide.

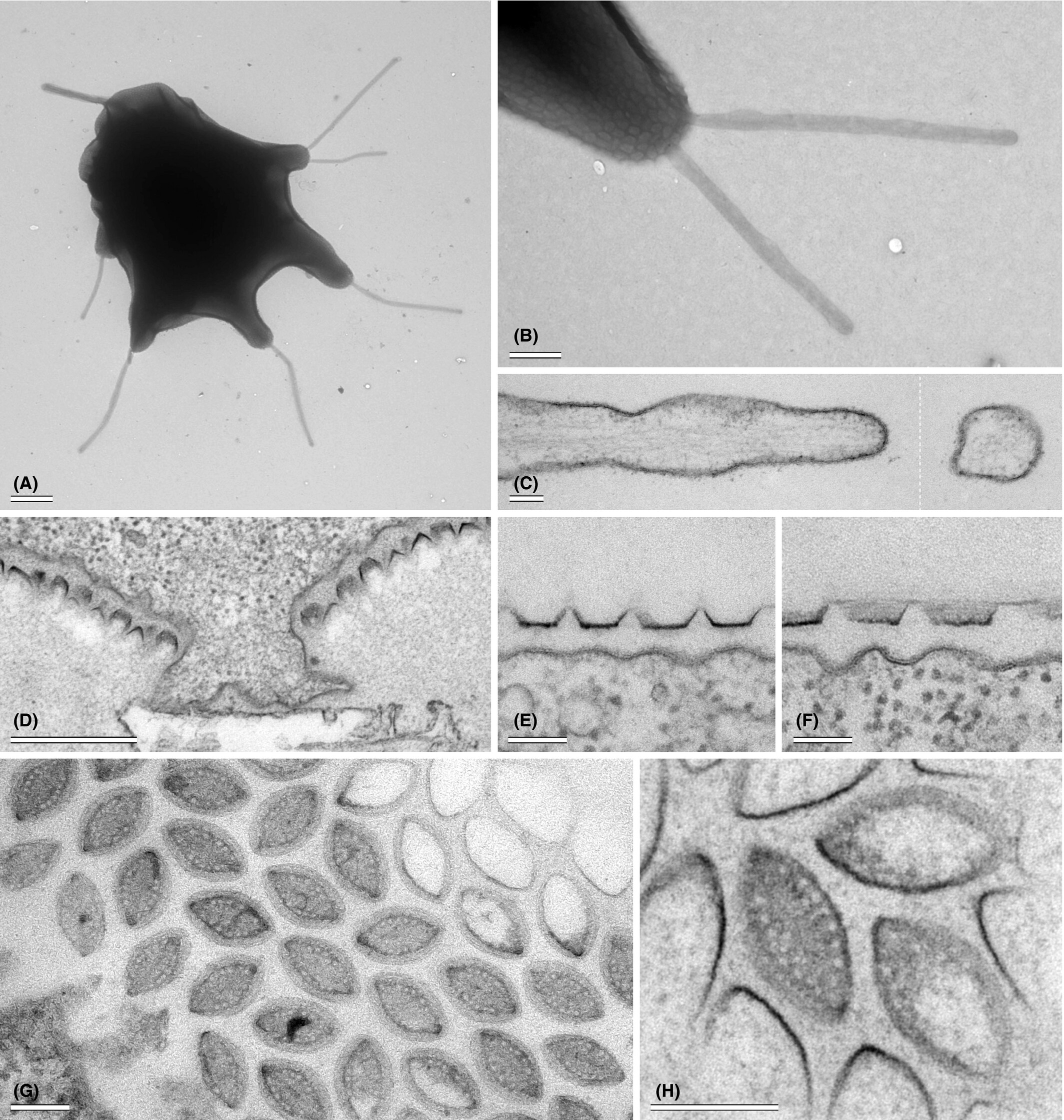
Ultrastructure of Idionectes vortex. (A) Whole cell showing with several pseudopodia that project leptopodia. (B) Two leptopodia from one pseudopodium. (C) Ultrathin sections through leptopodia. (D) Adhesion zone. (E and F) Cross sections through the scaly cell coat. (G and H) Boat-like scaly cell coat.

The protist can exist in two different forms: flagellate and amoeboid. It is the only known species of cutosean amoebas having both forms, as all other cutoseans are non-flagellated. As a flagellate, it projects out a single flagellum of about 30 μm long from the basal body and lives as a free swimmer in water. Although it is a flagellate, it is genetically more closely related to non-flagellated amoebas. In an amoeboid form, it can give off many pseudopodia as protrusions of the cell membrane to form needle-like processes called leptopodia. The leptopodia can be as long as 8 μm. In this condition, it lives as parasite inside algal cell.

== Life cycle ==
Idionectes is a parasitoid organism spending some of its lifetime as a parasite of algae and some as a free-swimming flagellate. The flagellate actively swims in water looking for green algae to attack upon. Once it comes in contact with the algal cell surface, it dissolves the algal cell wall and penetrates into the algal cytoplasm. As a type of the so-called phagotrophic protoplast feeders, it start feeding (by phagocytosis) on the cytoplasmic contents of the alga and loses its flagellum. As it ingest the algal plastid, it turns into bright green colour. It produces leptopodia from its pseudopodia for movement inside the alga. It then divides by mitosis and splits by binary fission. When the food source is depleted and feeding stopped, each daughter cell produces a flagellum from its flagellar pit. The flagellates escape into water and start swimming to restart another cycle of development.
