= Cutosea =

Scientific classification
- Domain: Eukaryota
- Phylum: Amoebozoa
- Clade: Evosea
- Class: Cutosea; Cavalier-Smith in Cavalier-Smith, Chao & Lewis 2016
- Order: Squamocutida; Cavalier-Smith in Cavalier-Smith, Chao & Lewis 2016

Families
- Squamamoebidae; Sapocribridae; Idionectidae

Diversity
- 4 species

Class of amoebae

Cutosea (from Latin cutis 'skin') is a small group of marine amoeboid protists proposed in 2016. It is a monotypic class of Amoebozoa containing the order Squamocutida (from Latin squama 'scale' and cutis 'skin'). Cutosean organisms are characterized by a cell coat of microscales separated from the cell membrane. Four genera, Armaparvus, Idionectes, Sapocribrum and Squamamoeba, belong to this group, distributed in three families.

== Characteristics ==
The cells of cutosean amoebae are surrounded by a continuous thin, somewhat flexible envelope, unique in structure because it is not attached to the cytoplasmic membrane. Below this envelope, they present oval microscales surrounded by a dense matrix. The small scales are not visible under a light microscope. The envelope is penetrated by one or many small pores, which allow subpseudopodia to occasionally protrude from the cell membrane, for a very slow locomotion. Locomoting cells are flattened, oval or round in shape. All of their cells lack cilia or centrosomes, except for the uniciliate swarm cells of the amoeboflagellate Idionectes.

== Taxonomy ==
=== History ===
Cutosea is a clade discovered through a 2016 phylogenetic study by Thomas Cavalier-Smith and his coauthors, published in the journal Molecular Phylogenetics and Evolution. It is described as a class-level rank, monotypic as it contains only one order Squamocutida. Additionally, it was grouped under the monotypic superclass Cutosa in 2016. In traditional rank-based classifications, it is grouped within the paraphyletic Lobosa, a subphylum of Amoebozoa that also contains Tubulinea and Discosea. Cutosean amoebae present a structurally unique cellular envelope, their distinguishing feature. Their names derive from the Latin cutis, meaning 'skin', and squama, meaning 'scale', referencing this envelope.

The Cutosea clade is supported by posterior molecular and morphological studies, and has been accepted as of 2019 by the International Society of Protistologists, which revises the modern cladistic classification of eukaryotes. The first genera to be grouped within Cutosea were Sapocribrum and Squamamoeba, discovered in 2015 and 2013 respectively, and placed in separate families Sapocribridae and Squamamoebidae. A third genus was discovered later in 2018, Armaparvus, which was added to Squamamoebidae. The fourth genus, Idionectes was discovered by Sebastian Hess and Alastair G. B. Simpson in 2019. In 2022, superclass Cutosa was no longer used.

=== Classification ===
Cutosea contains a total of four species, distributed in four monotypic genera:

- Family Idionectidae Hess & Simpson, 2019
  - Idionectes Hess & Simpson, 2019
    - Idionectes vortex Hess & Simpson, 2019
- Family Sapocribridae Cavalier-Smith in Cavalier-Smith, Chao & Lewis 2016
  - Sapocribrum Lahr, Grant, Molestina & Anderson, 2015
    - Sapocribrum chincoteaguense Lahr, Grant, Molestina & Anderson, 2015
- Family Squamamoebidae Cavalier-Smith in Cavalier-Smith, Chao & Lewis 2016
  - Armaparvus Schuler & Brown, 2018
    - Armaparvus languidus Schuler & Brown, 2018
  - Squamamoeba Kudryavtsev & Pawlowski, 2013
    - Squamamoeba japonica Kudryavtsev & Pawlowski, 2013

== Evolution ==
Cutosea is a fully supported clade within Amoebozoa. It is the sister group to Conosa, which contains all the non-lobose amoebozoans: Variosea, Archamoebea and Eumycetozoa. Together, Cutosea and Conosa are the two members of the larger clade Evosea. The following cladogram is based on a 2022 phylogenetic analysis:

- Amorphea
  - Amoebozoa
    - Tubulinea
    - - Discosea
      - Evosea
        - Cutosea
          - Squamamoebidae
          - Sapocribridae
        - Conosa
          - - Archamoebae
            - Eumycetozoa
          - Variosea
  - Obazoa
