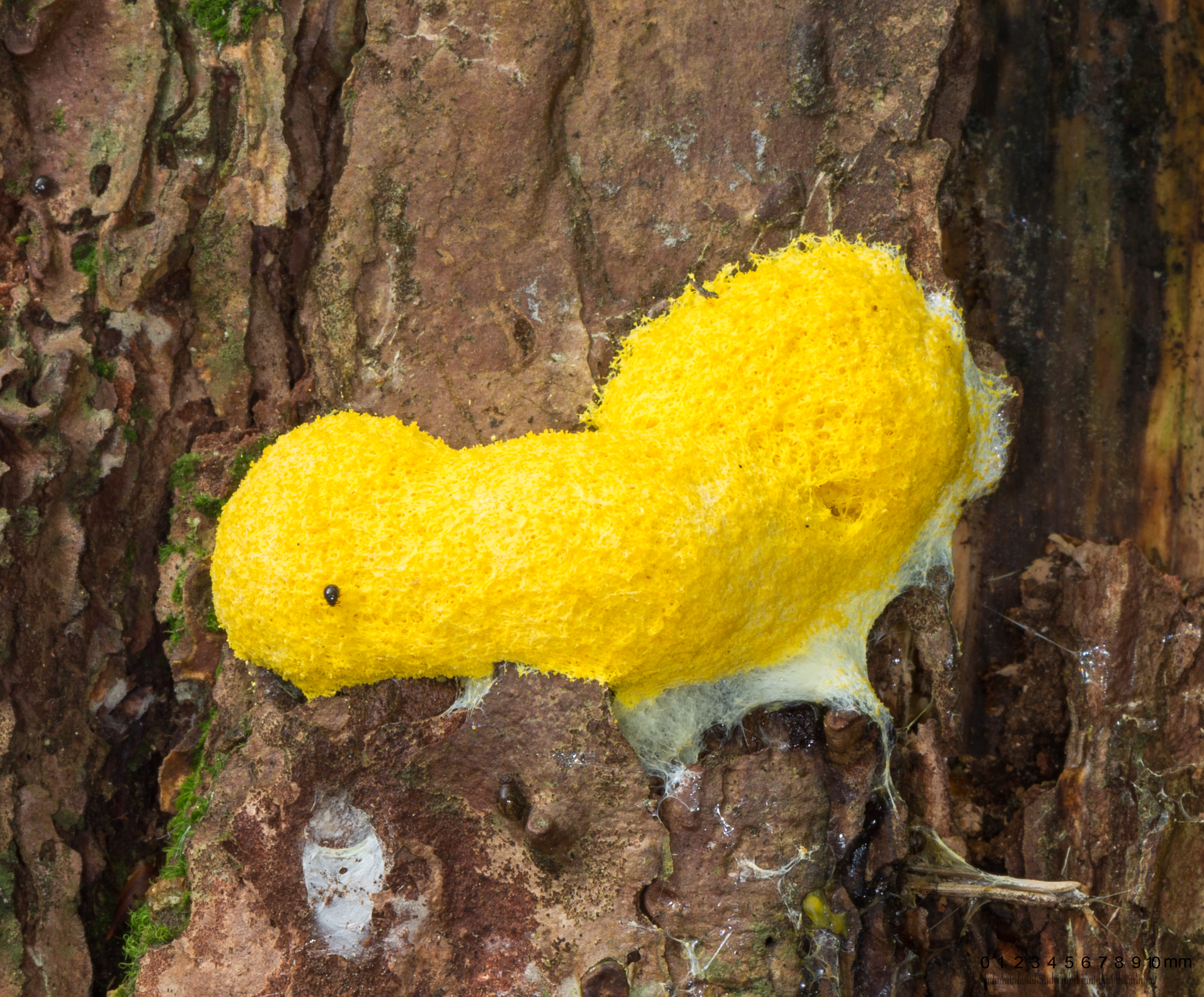
- Fuligo septica, a myxogastrid

Scientific classification
- Domain: Eukaryota
- Supergroup: Amorphea
- Phylum: Amoebozoa
- Subphylum: Conosa
- Infraphylum: Eumycetozoa; Zopf 1884 ex L.S.Olive 1975 sensu Kang et al. 2017 (Note: Zopf was the first to introduce the name Eumycetozoa, but no rank was given. Olive reintroduced it in 1975 as a class-level rank. Finally, in 2017 Kang and his coauthors renewed the definition of Eumycetozoa into its modern usage.)

Clades
- Dictyostelia; Myxogastria; Protosporangiida

Synonyms
- Macromycetozoa Fiore-Donno et al. 2010; Mycetozoa de Bary, 1859 ex Rostafinski, 1873 (Mycetozoa sensu stricto)

= Eumycetozoa =

Taxonomic group of slime molds

Eumycetozoa (from Ancient Greek εὖ (eû) 'true', μύκης (múkēs) 'fungus' and ζῷον (zôion) 'animal'), or true slime molds, is a diverse group of protists that behave as slime molds and develop fruiting bodies, either as sorocarps or as sporocarps. It is a monophyletic group or clade within the phylum Amoebozoa that contains the myxogastrids, dictyostelids and protosporangiids.

== Characteristics ==
Eumycetozoa is a clade that includes three groups of amoebozoan protists: Myxogastria, Dictyostelia and Protosporangiida—also known as Myxomycetes, Dictyosteliomycetes and Ceratiomyxomycetes, respectively. It is defined on a node-based approach as the least inclusive clade containing the species Dictyostelium discoideum (a dictyostelid), Physarum polycephalum (a myxogastrid) and Ceratiomyxa fruticulosa (a protosporangiid).

All known members of Eumycetozoa generate fruiting bodies, either as sorocarps (in dictyostelids) or as sporocarps (in myxogastrids and protosporangiids). Within their life cycle, they may appear as a single haploid amoeboid cells (in dictyostelids), or as flagellated amoebae with two cilia that give rise to obligate amoebae with no cilia, from which the sporocarps develop (in myxogastrids and protosporangiids). Eumycetozoa flourish in swamp forests.

The flagellated amoebae of myxogastrids and protosporangiids and non-flagellated amoebae of dictyostelids have a flat cell shape. They form wide pseudopodia with acutely pointed subpseudopodia (i.e. smaller pseudopodia that grow beneath). Unlike other amoebae, the pseudopodia lack a prominent streaming of granular cytoplasm.

In eumycetozoans where sexual reproduction is well studied, the zygote cannibalizes on haploid amoebae.

== Evolution ==
Eumycetozoa is a well supported clade within Amoebozoa. In independent phylogenetic analyses, it has been consistently recovered as the sister group to Archamoebae. The Eumycetozoa+Archamoebae clade is, in turn, the sister group to Variosea. Within Eumycetozoa, Dictyostelia has a basal position while Myxogastria and Protosporangiida form a clade. Together, these three groups are part of the larger clade Conosa. The following cladogram is based on a 2022 analysis:

- Amoebozoa
  - Tubulinea
  - - Discosea
    - Evosea
      - Cutosea
      - Conosa
        - - Archamoebae
          - Eumycetozoa
            - Dictyostelia
            - - Myxogastria
              - Protosporangiida
        - Variosea

== Taxonomy ==
The name Eumycetozoa was first used by German mycologist Friedrich Wilhelm Zopf in 1884, although no formal taxonomic rank was given. In 1975, mycologist Lindsay Shepherd Olive reintroduced the name Eumycetozoa as a class containing the three groups of fruiting amoebae traditionally included in this taxon: Myxogastria, Dictyostelia and Protostelia. Olive hypothesized that all fruiting amoebae were grouped by this monophyletic taxon, and that the Myxogastria and Dictyostelia were also monophyletic taxa that evolved from a paraphyletic grade of Protostelia. This definition of Eumycetozoa, which included protostelids, was maintained in the 2005 cladistic classification of eukaryotes, where the name was synonymized with Mycetozoa.

- Amoebozoa Lühe, 1913, emend. Cavalier-Smith, 1998
  - Eumycetozoa Zopf, 1884, emend. L.S.Olive, 1975 [=Mycetozoa de Bary, 1873]
    - Protostelia L.S. Olive, 1975 (P)
    - Myxogastria Macbride, 1899 [=Myxomycetes Link, 1833, emend. Haeckel, 1866]
    - Dictyostelia Lister, 1909, emend. L.S.Olive, 1970
    - Incertae sedis Eumycetozoa: Copromyxa, Copromyxella, Fonticula

However, studies in the 2000s decade disproved this hypothesis. Both morphological and molecular studies showed that Eumycetozoa includes a number of non-fruiting amoeboid groups. More importantly, the Protostelia were discovered to be polyphyletic. The protosteloid type of fruiting body formation, initially considered the ancestral feature shared between all Eumycetozoa, has evolved independently at least in eight lineages within Amoebozoa (e.g. soliformoviids, cavosteliids, schizoplasmodiids, protosporangiids). This discovery lead to the conclusion that the entirety of Amoebozoa became a synonym of Eumycetozoa, and was treated as such in the 2012 cladistic classification of eukaryotes. The term Amoebozoa was conserved as a familiar well-established name of popular usage, despite the term Eumycetozoa having priority as the older name.

To preserve this widely used name, biologist Seungho Kang and his coauthors redefined Eumycetozoa in 2017 to include only one group of protosteloid amoebae, the Protosporangiida (also known as Ceratiomyxomycetes), which are a monophyletic taxon. This usage corresponds to the 1975 hypothesis from Olive that postulates a clade of exclusively fruiting protists that includes myxogastrids, dictyostelids, and some protosteloid amoebae (in this case, the protosporangiids). As of 2019, this renewed definition is accepted by the scientific community and appears in the modern cladistic classification of eukaryotes, revised by the International Society of Protistologists. The name Macromycetozoa was suggested earlier, but Eumycetozoa was chosen for being the oldest term.

- Amoebozoa Lühe, 1913, emend. Cavalier-Smith, 1998
  - Evosea Kang et al. 2017
    - Eumycetozoa Zopf 1884 ex L.S. Olive, sensu Kang et al. 2017 [=Macromycetozoa Fiore-Donno et al. 2010]
      - Dictyostelia Lister 1909, sensu Sheikh et al. 2018
      - Myxogastria Macbride 1899 [=Myxomycetes Link 1833, sensu Haeckel 1866]
      - Protosporangiida Shadwick & Spiegel in Adl et al. 2012

The name Mycetozoa was maintained in traditional classifications by some authors like Thomas Cavalier-Smith, who also used a renewed definition to include only protosporangiids. However this scheme did not acquire wide usage.
