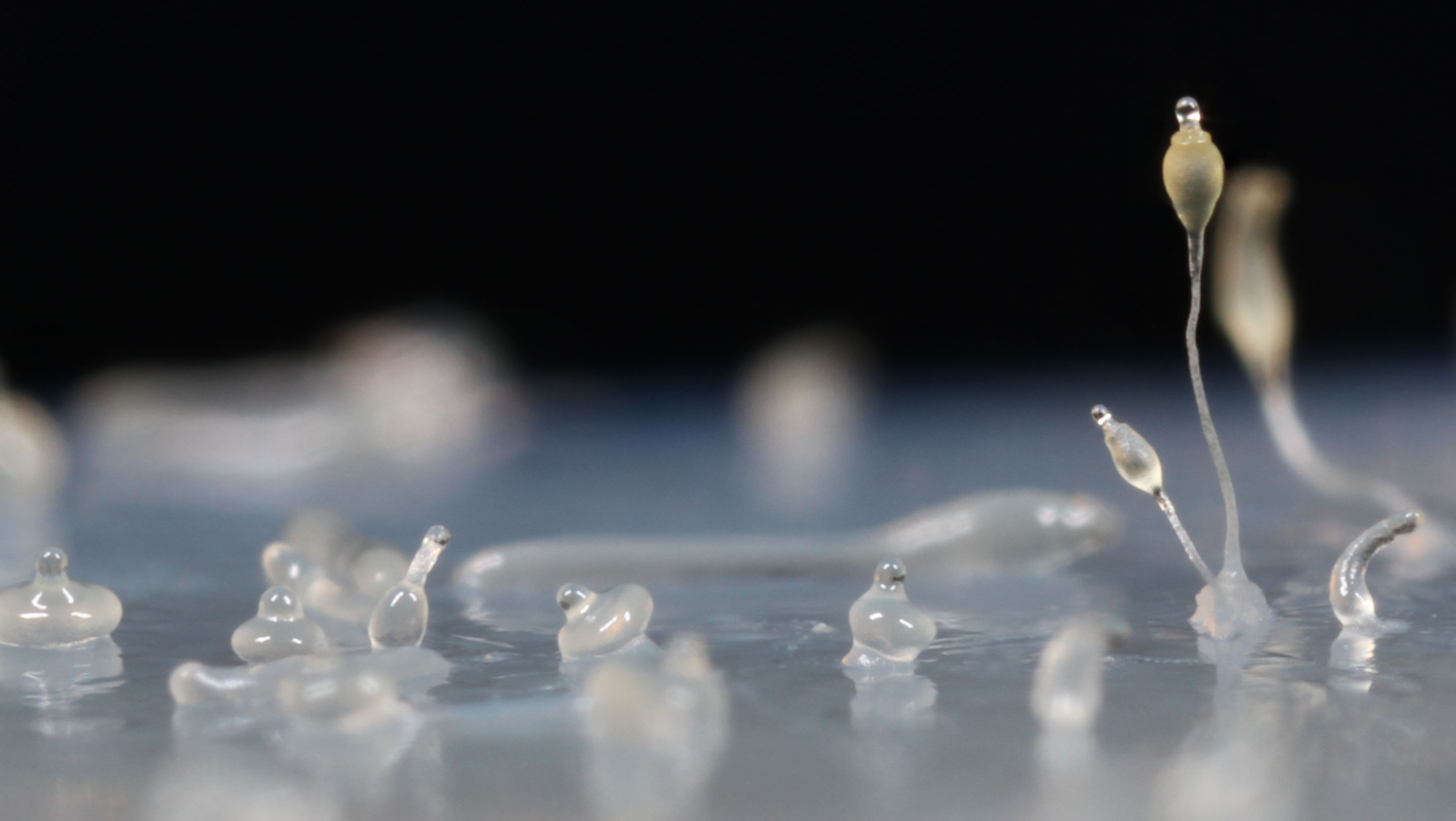
- Dictyostelium discoideum

Scientific classification
- Domain: Eukaryota
- Phylum: Amoebozoa
- Clade: Evosea
- Subphylum: Conosa; Cavalier-Smith, 1998

Subgroups
- Archamoebae; Variosea; Eumycetozoa

= Conosa =

Phylum of protozoans

Conosa is a grouping of Amoebozoa. It is subdivided into three groups: Archamoeba, Variosea and Mycetozoa.

In some classifications, the mycetozoan Myxogastria and Dictyostelia are united in Macromycetozoa (= Eumycetozoa).

Conosa includes the species Dictyostelium discoideum, a social amoeba, and Entamoeba histolytica, a human pathogen, among others.

Conosa are morphologically defined by a conical microtubular structure, and have been found to be monophyletic.

== Characteristics ==
The Conosa group was first proposed by Thomas Cavalier-Smith in 1998 as a subphylum of Amoebozoa. Cavalier-Smith originally separated this group into two infraphyla: Archamoebae and Mycetozoa. Notable characteristics of these two groups are that Mycetozoa are free living, while Archamoebae are amitochondrial. This clade is morphologically defined by their complex microtubular skeleton that forms a partial or complete cone. They have a monolayer of microtubules that surround at least some of the anterior end of the cell and diverge into a cone shape towards the nucleus at the posterior end. This cone of microtubules usually starts at a single centriole and extends towards the nucleus. They also have a lateral microtubular ribbon towards the cell surface. Conosa can exist as aggregate aerobes with mitochondria and also as solitary anaerobes with no mitochondria or peroxisomes. There are mitochondriate and amitochondriate members, as well as free living and parasitic representatives. Mitochondria reduction could be a result of transitions to a parasitic lifestyle, as is seen in the amitochondral human parasite Entamoeba histolytica.

== Phylogeny ==
Conosa are separated from Lobosa, the other Amoebozoa subphylum, by morphological characteristics and genomic differences. Conosa have both amoeboid and flagellate forms or stages and more pointed pseudopodia with branches. In contrast, Lobosa are entirely amoeboid with broad pseudopodia. Conosa's flagella are artifacts of their ancestral conditions and are seen in trophic and swarm cell phases. Flagellate Conosa have a cone-shaped microtubular skeleton, and non-ciliate forms contain extensive microtubes in the cytoplasm, both of which are not seen in Lobosa.

While morphological characteristics like pseudopodia and body shape, flagella, and cytoplasm properties have not been regarded as convincing taxonomic suggestions, emerging sequencing data is being used to support Conosa’s monophyly. A study using several hundred phylogenetic markers of 30 species found Conosa to be monophyletic as representatives of Mycetozoa, Entamoebidae, and Pelobionta grouped together using several amino acid sequencing analysis methods. The monophyly of Conosa and the Archamoebea infraphyla was also supported by cDNA sequencing of seventeen Amoebozoans. However, the monophyly of Conosa is not entirely supported. For example, another study using seven protein-coding genes did not find Conosa to be monophyletic due to members of Lobosa sharing a phylogenetic branch with the Conosan lineage Variosea. This same study did find all three Conosan lineages to be monophyletic.

- Amoebozoa
  - Discosea
    - Flabellinia
    - Centramoebia
  - Tevosa
    - Tubulinea
      - Corycidia
      - - Echinamoebia
        - Elardia
    - Evosea
      - Cutosea
      - Conosa
        - Archamoebea
        - Semiconosia
          - Variosea
          - Eumycetozoa
            - Dictyostelea
            - - Ceratiomyxea
              - Myxogastrea
- Opisthokonta

== Evolution ==
The last common ancestor of Conosa was likely an aerobic protist with anterior and recurrent flagellum. It likely had mitochondria, while mitochondrial reduction has resulted in both mitochondriate and amitochondriate members today. The ancestral biflagellate condition is seen in some extant Conosa forms. In some Archamoebae, the posterior flagella and its related cytoskeleton has been lost, and others have lost the entire flagellar system. The conical microtubular skeleton convergently evolved in Archamoebae and Variosea, but not in Mycetozoa. A study of the complete proteomic content of 23 eukaryotic genomes found that representative members of Mycetozoa and Archamoebae do share a common ancestor, and their divergence occurred almost as long ago as the split of fungi and animals.

== Gallery ==
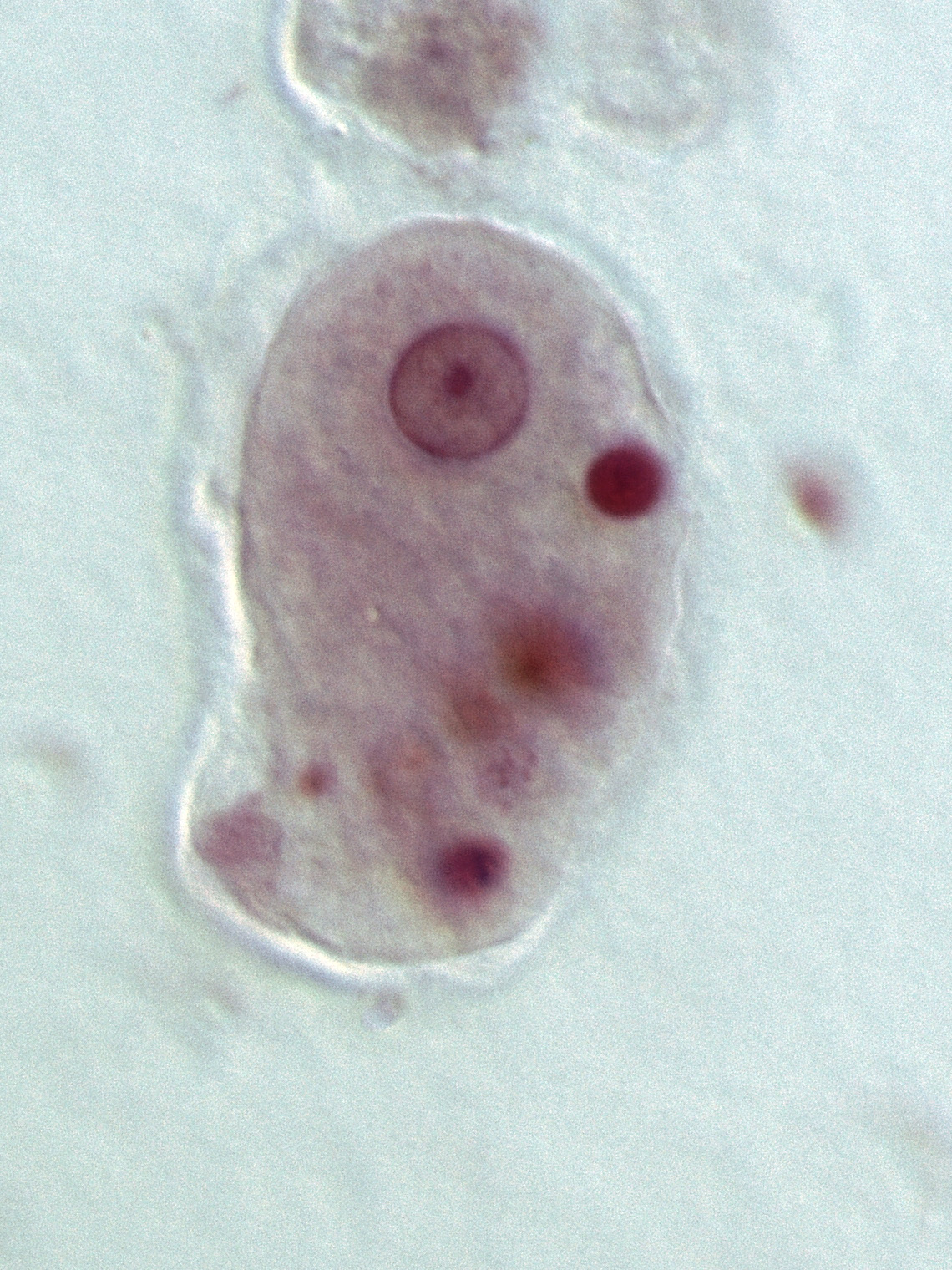
Entamoeba histolytica trophozoite

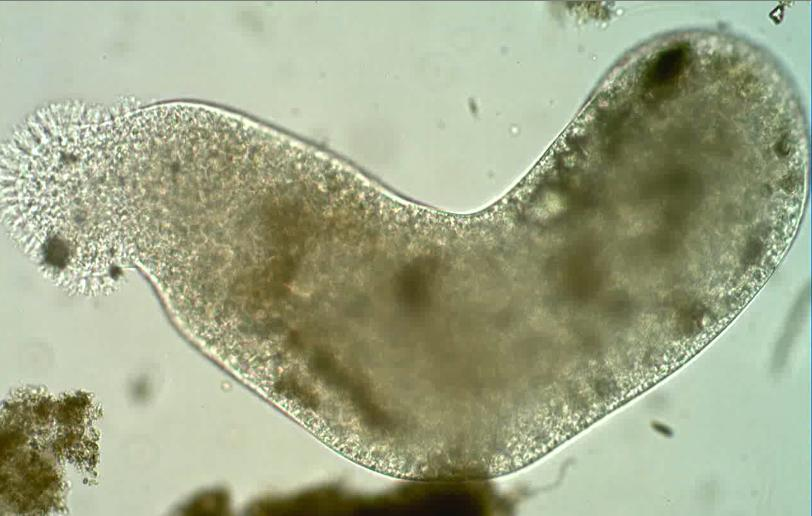
Pelomyxa palustris

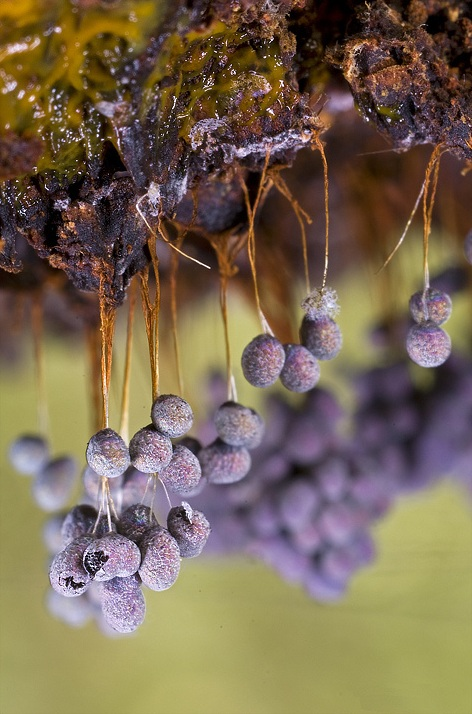
Badhamia utricularis (Myxogastria: Physarales)
