= Symbiosis in Amoebozoa =

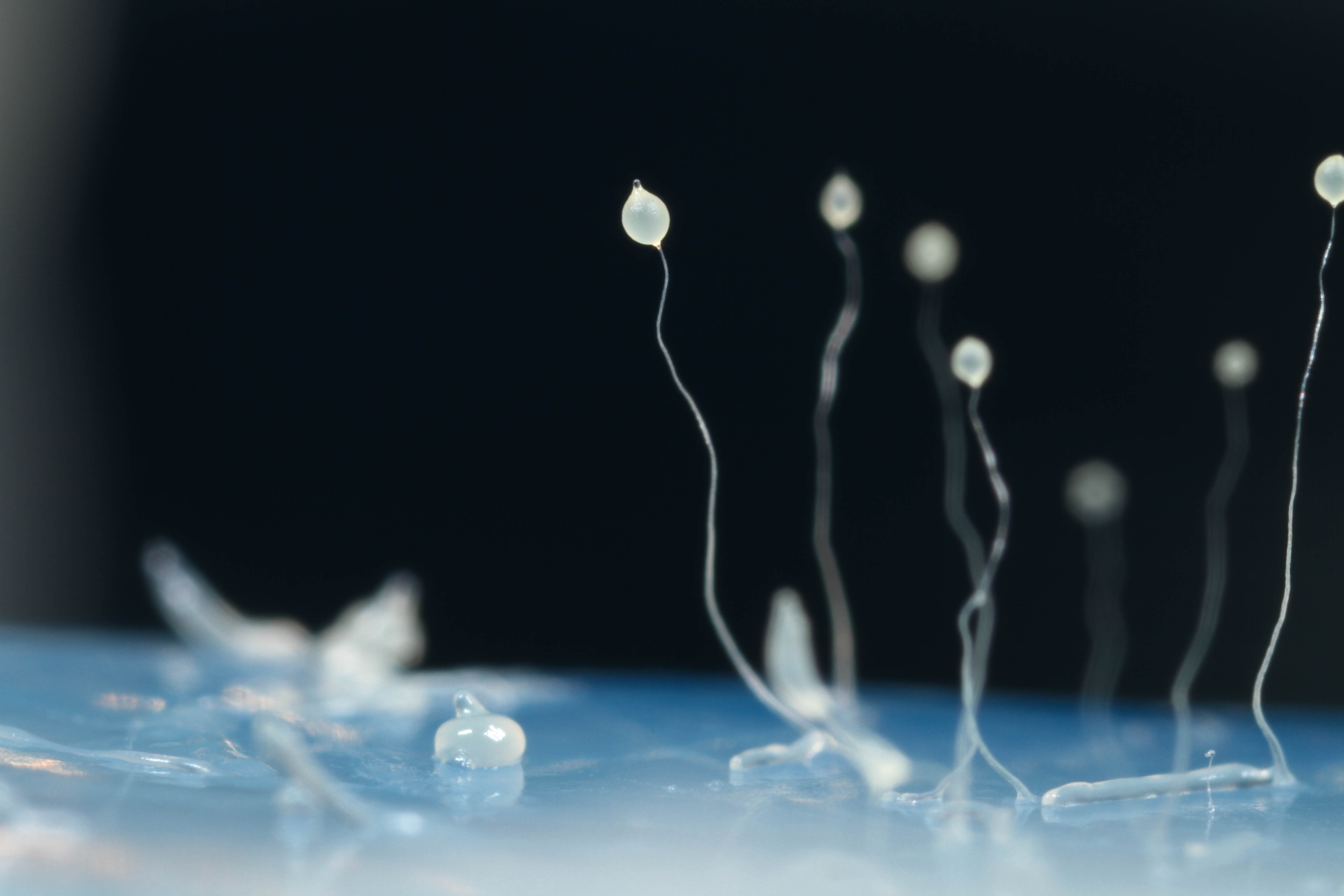
Dictyostelium discoideum

Amoebozoa of the free living genus Acanthamoeba and the social amoeba genus Dictyostelium are single celled eukaryotic organisms that feed on bacteria, fungi, and algae through phagocytosis, with digestion occurring in phagolysosomes. Amoebozoa are present in most terrestrial ecosystems including soil and freshwater. Amoebozoa contain a vast array of symbionts that range from transient to permanent infections, confer a range of effects from mutualistic to pathogenic, and can act as environmental reservoirs for animal pathogenic bacteria. As single celled phagocytic organisms, amoebas simulate the function and environment of immune cells like macrophages, and as such their interactions with bacteria and other microbes are of great importance in understanding functions of the human immune system, as well as understanding how microbiomes can originate in eukaryotic organisms.

== Amoeba-resistant microorganisms ==
Some microorganisms have evolved to become resistant to Amoebozoa, and are able to survive, grow, and exit free-living amoebae after phagocytosis. In order for an organism to survive in an Amoebozoa, they have developed a way to avoid or survive digestion by their host's acidic and oxidative phagolysosomes. Many of these amoeba-resistant microorganisms (ARMs) survive either in the amoeba cytoplasm or in host derived vacuoles surrounded by plasma membrane, allowing them to not only avoid digestion, but actively reproduce inside their host with some are capable of lysing the amoeba host cell. Known symbionts of Amoebozoa include bacteria from Alphaproteobacteria, Betaproteobacteria, Bacteroidetes, Firmicutes, Proteobacteria, Chlamydiae, and Paraburkholderia, all with different effects on their host, even within the same phylum. For example, some Chlamydiae bacteria are able to increase the growth rates of their hosts or increase motility, other Chlamydiae strains are able to fight off other pathogenic symbionts like legionella, and some Chlamydiae are parasitic and decrease host fitness.

Many free living amoeba species inhabit aquatic environments, including manufactured water systems. While in their encysted state, amoebas have a high resistance to extreme temperatures, UV radiation, osmolarity, and pH. Some species of pathogenic bacteria are able to take advantage of this resistance and survive in environments that would usually destroy them, and are able to use the amoebas as a "Trojan horse" to travel to new environments and animal hosts. Legionella pneumophila, a known human pathogen, has been observed in at least 13 different species of amoeba. Legionella has been shown to survive inside of an encysted amoeba host in chlorine treated water, and can release from the host in respirable vesicles when treated with biocides, with each vesicle possibly containing hundreds of legionella bacteria spread by aerosolized water. Recent human outbreaks of Legionella are likely due to aerosolized water containing amoeba derived Legionella vesicles produced by modern devices such as air-conditioning systems, water cooling towers, showers, clinical respiration devices, and whirlpool baths that have been contaminated with host amoebae.

== Farming symbionts ==
Another unique example of symbiosis occurs in the social amoeba Dictyostelium discoideum. D. discoideum and other social amoeba differ from free living Acanthamoeba in that instead of encysting, they undergo a social cycle where individual D. discoideum cells aggregate together in a food scarce environment. This social cycle results in a differentiation between cells: ~20% are sacrificed to form a structural stalk, some transform into sentinel cells with immune like and detoxifying functions, and the rest of the aggregated amoeba form a ball of spores located in protective fruiting body. This fruiting body gives some amoeba from that population a chance to be transported to a food rich environment and survive. If they are not transported to a food rich environment, then the amoebas of that fruiting body will starve. Some D. discoideum amoebas contain Burkholderia bacteria that have been found to form a type of farming symbiosis with their discoideum hosts, who have reduced sentinel cell numbers. Burkholderia are able to persist in the fruiting bodies of their hosts that are carried by an animal or environmental path to a new environment. If there are few food bacteria in that new environment, then the social amoeba are able to seed the area with the contained Burkholderia and thus develop a food source. Farmer amoebas do produce fewer spores in a food rich environment than non-farmer amoebas, but this cost is countered by farmers' ability to replenish their food supply when dispersing to food-poor environments. Additionally, some farmed Burkholderia produce compounds that are not detrimental to the amoeba host, but are detrimental to nonfarmer amoebas, giving the farmer amoebas a competitive advantage in mixed populations.

== Viral interactions ==
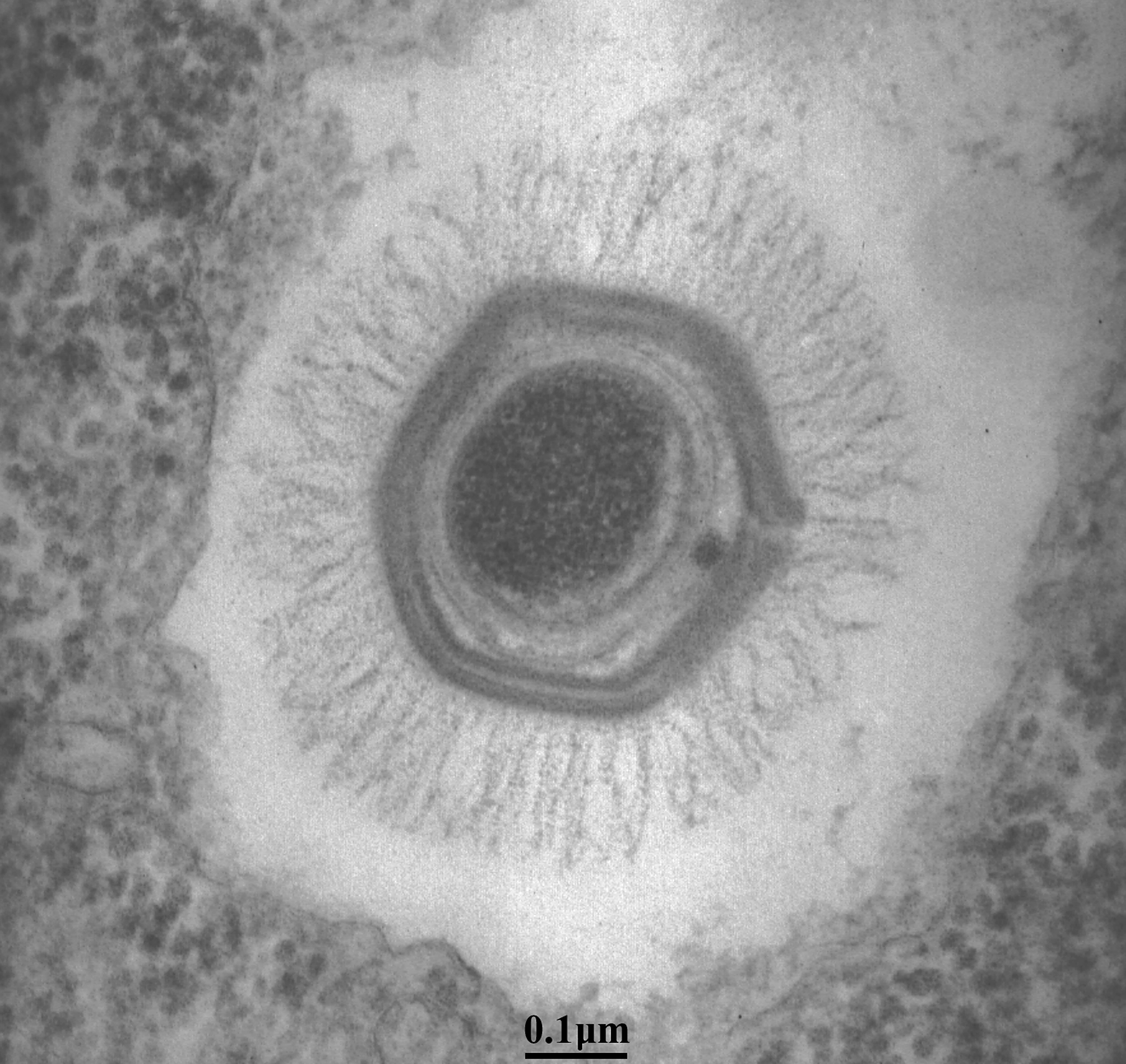
Electron microscopy image of giant virus Mimivirus

Giant viruses, or nucleocytoplasmic large DNA viruses, frequently infect Amoebozoa and other protists causing amoeba lysis and cell rounding in 12 hours and amoeba population collapse in 55 hours. As such, there is a strong selective pressure on both Amoebozoa and their symbionts to resist these viruses. Acanthamoeba hattchettii is one species affected by giant viruses, and some use a bacterial symbiont (Parachlamydia acanthamoebae) to counter giant viruses from Marseilleviridae and Mimiviridae. Acanthamoeba that are infected with the chlamydiae symbiont and giant viruses are able to avoid lysis and cell rounding that normally occur with infection by repressing viral replication after the virus enters the cell, likely due to secondary metabolites produced by the symbiont. Acanthamoeba that are not infected by the symbiont or virus have the highest fitness with a doubling time that is twice as fast, Acanthamoeba that are infected with the chlamydia symbiont have the same fitness when infected by the virus and when not, and Acanthamoeba that are infected with just the virus have the lowest fitness with a total population collapse. Therefore, the chlamydiae symbiont acts as a mutualist with a significantly positive fitness effect during viral predation, but is also consistent with the parasitic lifestyle of many chlamydiae when acanthamoeba is not a victim of viral predation. As an obligate intracellular bacterium, the chlamydiae symbiont is effectively competing in the same niche as other giant viruses, and so has evolved to protect its host from its natural competitor.
