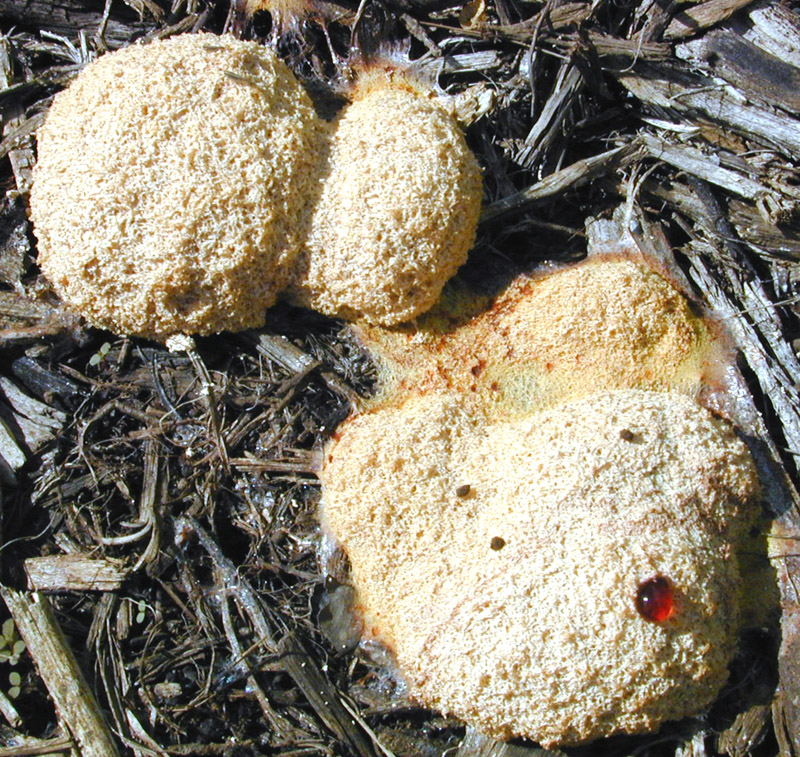
- Aethalium of a slime mold (Fuligo septica)

Scientific classification
- Domain: Eukaryota
- Clade: Amorphea
- Phylum: Amoebozoa
- Subphylum: Conosa
- Infraphylum: Mycetozoa de Bary, 1873

Classes and orders
- Protostelia; Protosteliida; Myxogastria; Liceida; Echinosteliida; Trichiida; Stemonitida; Physarales; Dictyostelia; Dictyosteliida

Synonyms
- Eumycetozoa Zopf, 1884, emend. Olive, 1975; Myxomycota sensu Whittaker, 1969

= Mycetozoa =

Infraphylum of protists

Mycetozoa is a polyphyletic grouping of slime molds. It was originally thought to be a monophyletic clade, but in 2010 it was discovered that protostelia are a polyphyletic group within Conosa.

== Classification ==
Mycetozoa can be divided into dictyostelid, myxogastrid, and protostelid groups.

The mycetozoan groups all fit into the unikont supergroup Amoebozoa, whereas most other slime molds fit into various bikont groups (fonticulids are opisthokonts).

== Utility in research ==
The dictyostelids are used as examples of cell communication and differentiation, and may provide insights into how multicellular organisms develop.

Physarum polycephalum are useful for studying cytoplasmic streaming. They have also been used to study the biochemical events that surround mitosis, since all of the nuclei in a medium-sized plasmodium divide in synchrony. It has been observed that they can find their way through mazes by spreading out and choosing the shortest path, an interesting example of information processing without a nervous system. Myxomycete plasmodia have also been used to study the genetics of asexual cell fusion. The giant size of the plasmodial cells allows for easy evaluation of complete or partial cell fusion.

In 2006, researchers at the University of Southampton and the University of Kobe reported that they had built a six-legged robot whose movement was remotely controlled by a Physarum slime mold. The mold directed the robot into a dark corner most similar to its natural habitat.

Slime molds are sometimes studied in advanced mathematics courses. Slime mold aggregation is a natural process that can be approximated with partial differential equations.

== Meiosis ==
Members of the Mycetozoa group are able to undergo sexual reproduction either by heterothallic or homothallic mating. An analysis of meiosis-related genes in the Dictyostelium discoideum genome revealed that 36 of the 44 genes tested were present in the genome. One gene, Spo11, was absent in the Mycetozoa, raising questions about the assumed universal role of Spo11 as an initiator of meiosis.

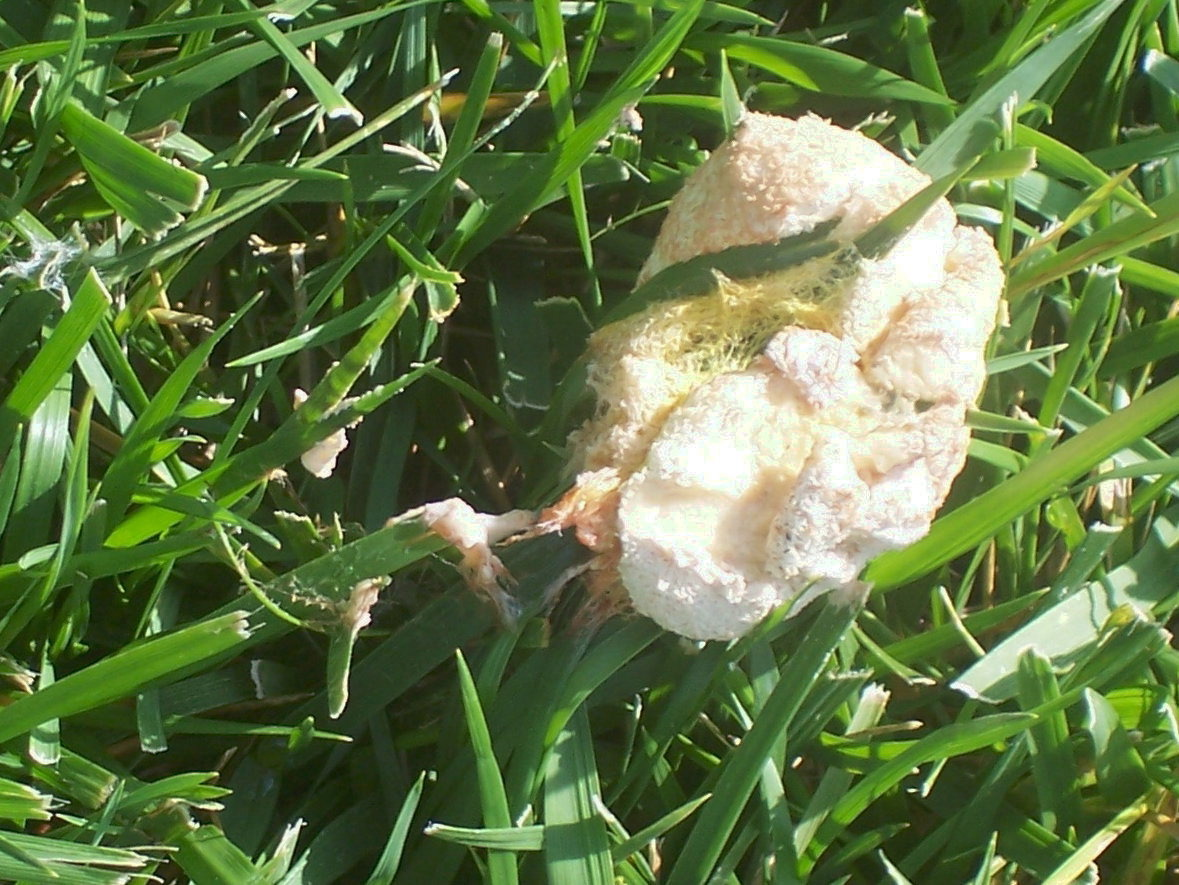
Slime mold on lawn, USA. Trail of movement can be seen.

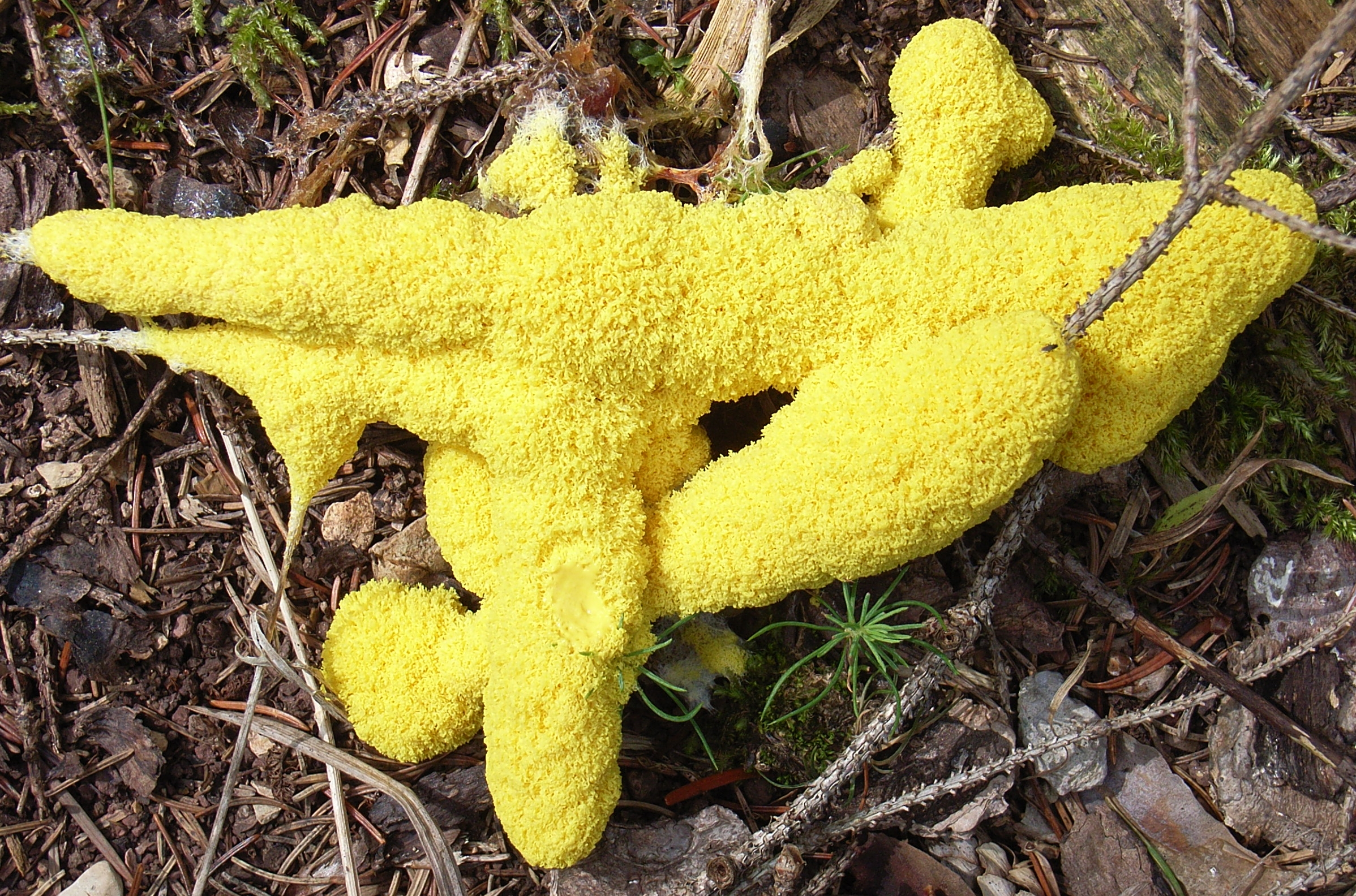
Fuligo septica.

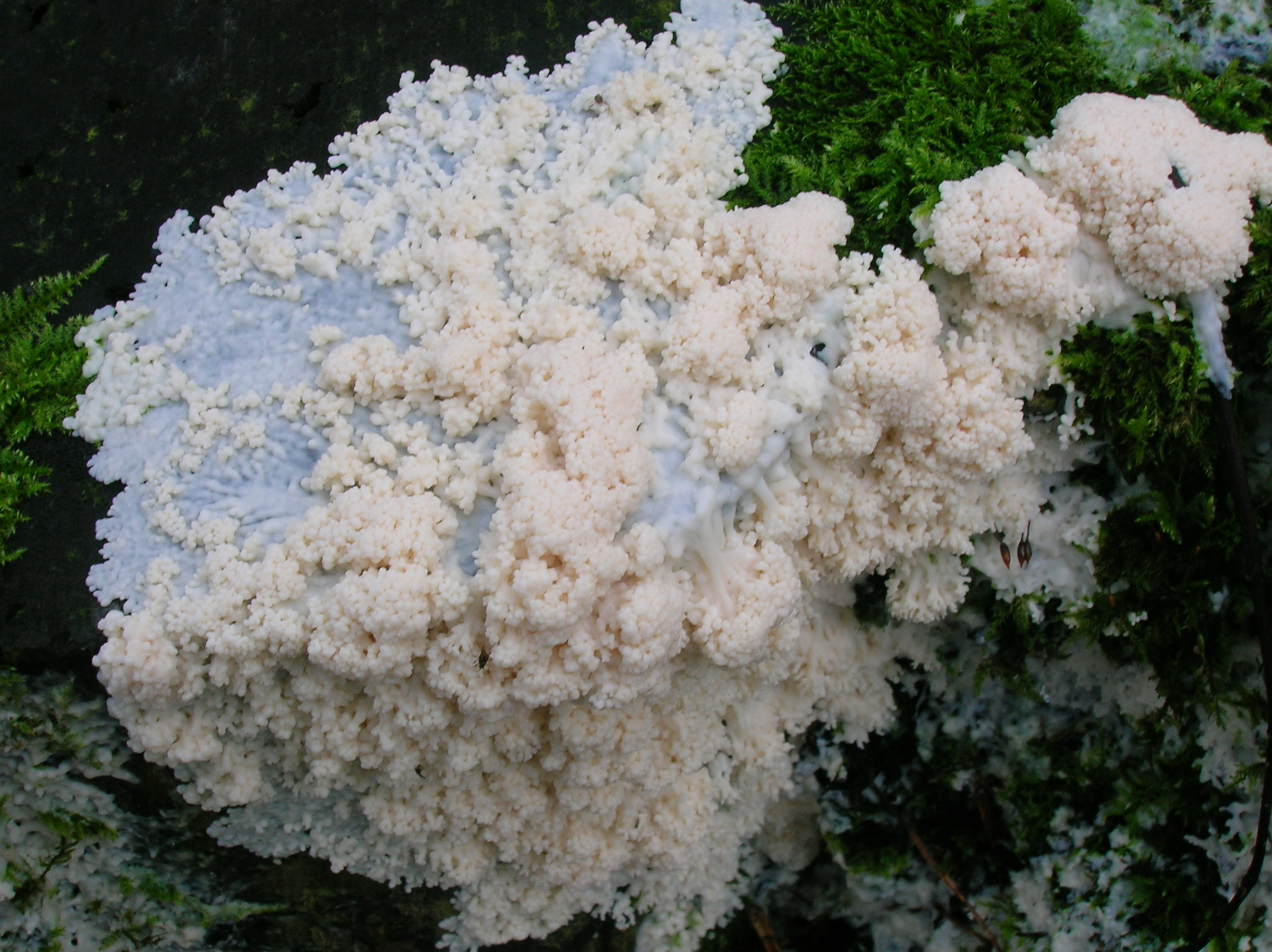
Brefeldia maxima on a tree stump in Scotland.

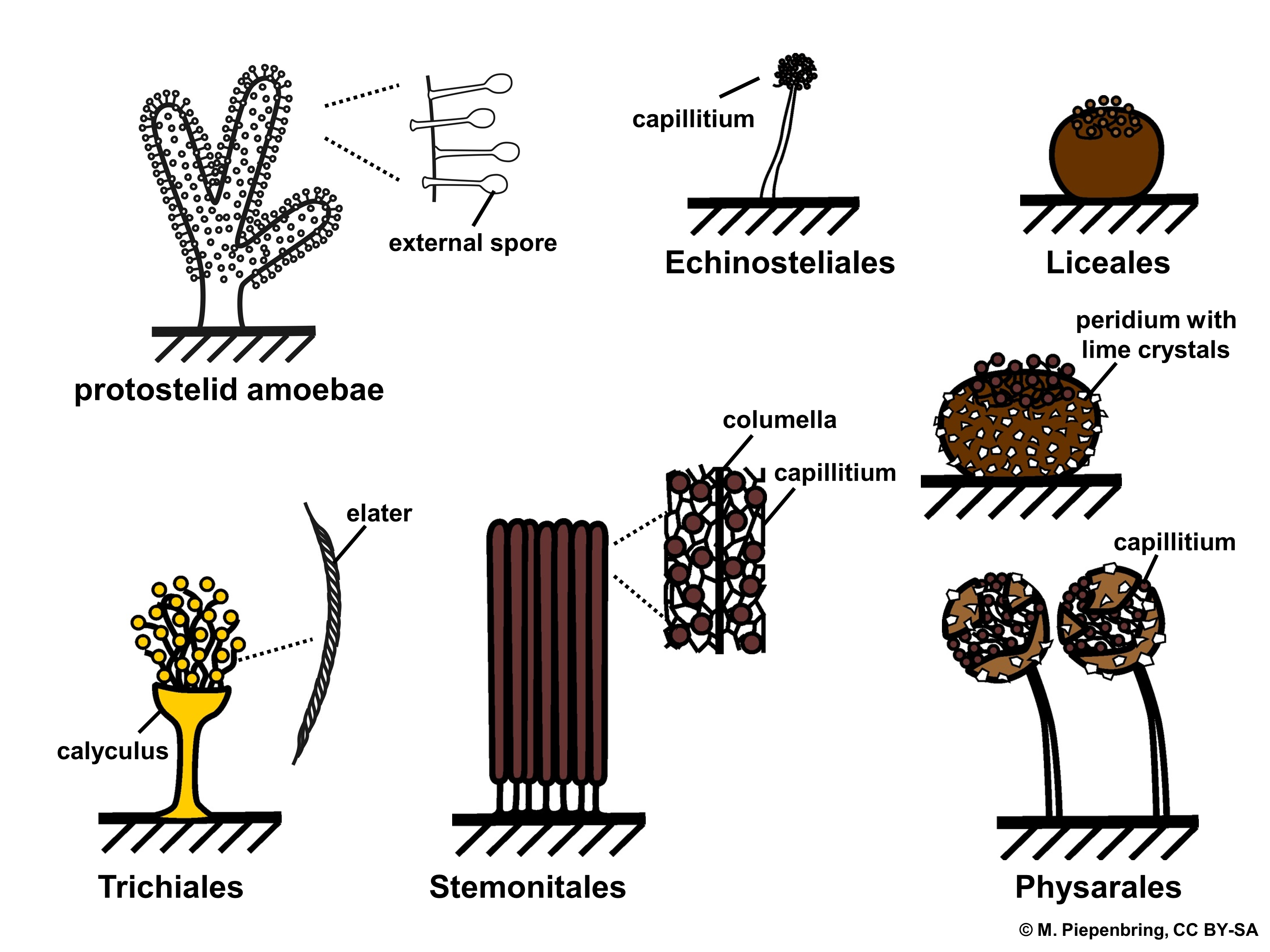
Sporangia types in the protostelids and in the myxogastrid groups (Echinosteliales, Liceales, Trichiales, Stemonitales, Physarales)
