= Protozoa =

Single-celled organisms

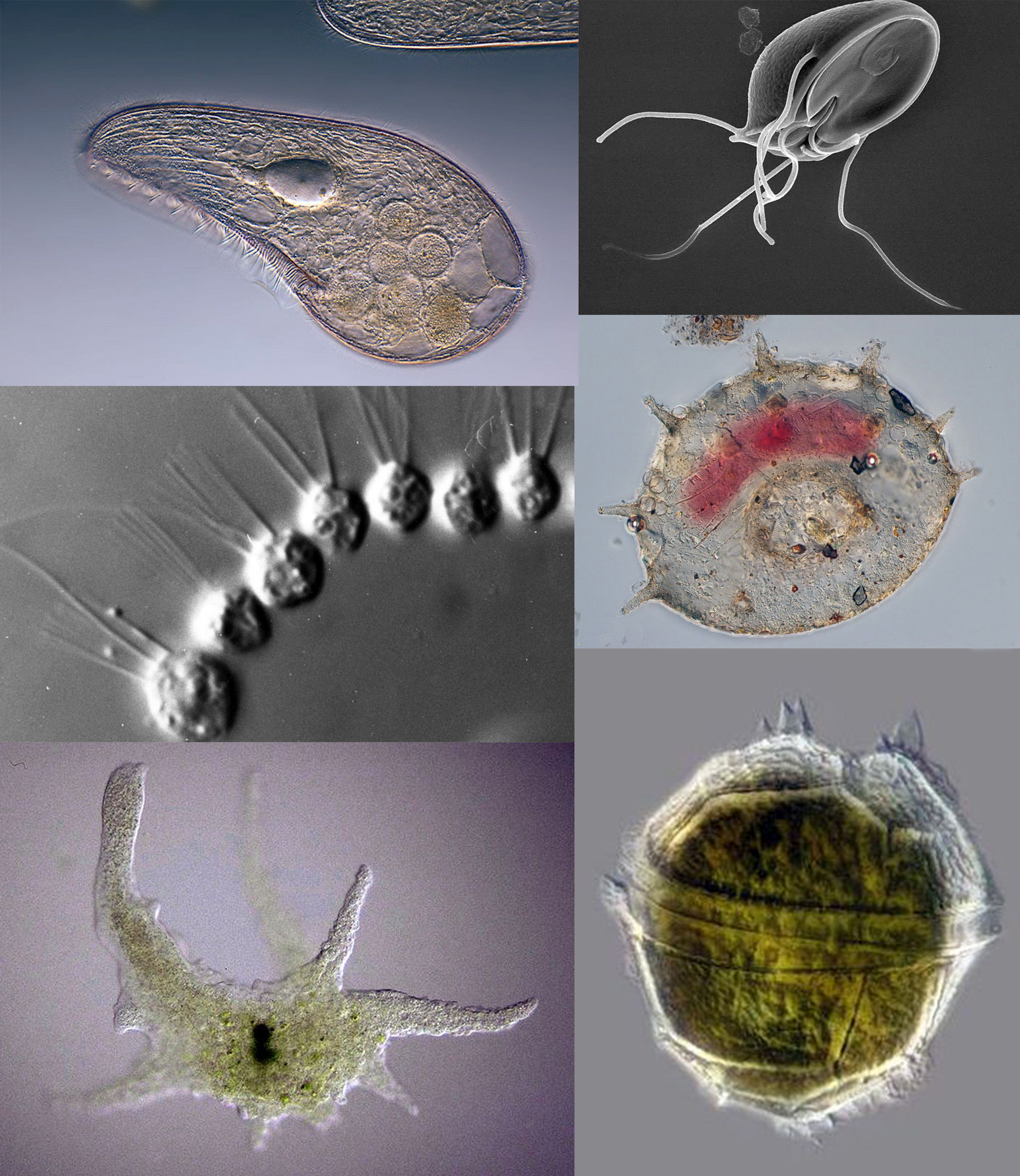
Clockwise from top left: Blepharisma japonicum, a ciliate; Giardia muris, a parasitic flagellate; Centropyxis aculeata, a testate (shelled) amoeba; Peridinium willei, a dinoflagellate; Chaos carolinense, a naked amoebozoan; Desmarella moniliformis, a choanoflagellate

Protozoa (sing.: protozoan or protozoon; alternative plural: protozoans) are a polyphyletic group of single-celled eukaryotes, either free-living or parasitic, that feed on organic matter such as other microorganisms or organic debris. Historically, protozoans were regarded as "one-celled animals".

When first introduced by Georg Goldfuss, in 1818, the taxon Protozoa was erected as a class within the Animalia, with the word 'protozoa' meaning "first animals", because they often possess animal-like behaviours, such as motility and predation, and lack a cell wall, as found in plants and many algae.

This classification remained widespread in the 19th and early 20th century, and even became elevated to a variety of higher ranks, including phylum, subkingdom, kingdom, and then sometimes included within the paraphyletic Protoctista or Protista.

By the 1970s, it became usual to require that all taxa be monophyletic (all members being derived from one common ancestor that is itself regarded as belonging in the taxon), and holophyletic (containing all of the known descendants of that common ancestor). The taxon 'Protozoa' fails to meet these standards, so grouping protozoa with animals, and treating them as closely related, became no longer justifiable.

The term continues to be used in a loose way to describe single-celled protists (that is, eukaryotes that are not animals, plants, or fungi) that feed by heterotrophy. Traditional textbook examples of protozoa are Amoeba, Paramecium, Euglena and Trypanosoma.

== History of classification ==
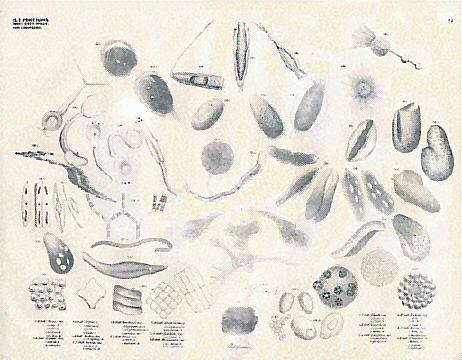
Class Protozoa, order Infusoria, family Monades by Georg August Goldfuss, c. 1844

The word "protozoa" (singular protozoon) was coined in 1818 by zoologist Georg August Goldfuss (=Goldfuß), as the Greek-derived calque of the German Urthiere, meaning "primitive, or original animals" (ur- 'proto-' + Thier 'animal'). Goldfuss created Protozoa as a class containing what he believed to be the simplest animals. Originally, the group included not only single-celled microorganisms but also some "lower" multicellular animals, such as rotifers, corals, sponges, jellyfish, bryozoans and polychaete worms. The term Protozoa is formed from the Greek words πρῶτος (prôtos), meaning "first", and ζῷα (zôia), plural of ζῷον (zôion), meaning "animal".

In 1848, with better microscopes and Theodor Schwann and Matthias Schleiden's cell theory, the zoologist C. T. von Siebold proposed that the bodies of protozoa such as ciliates and amoebae consisted of single cells, similar to those from which the multicellular tissues of plants and animals were constructed. Von Siebold redefined Protozoa to include only such unicellular forms, to the exclusion of all Metazoa (animals). At the same time, he raised the group to the level of a phylum containing two broad classes of microorganisms: Infusoria (mostly ciliates) and flagellates (flagellated protists and amoebae). The definition of Protozoa as a phylum or subkingdom composed of "unicellular animals" was adopted by the zoologist Otto Bütschli—celebrated at his centenary as the "architect of protozoology".

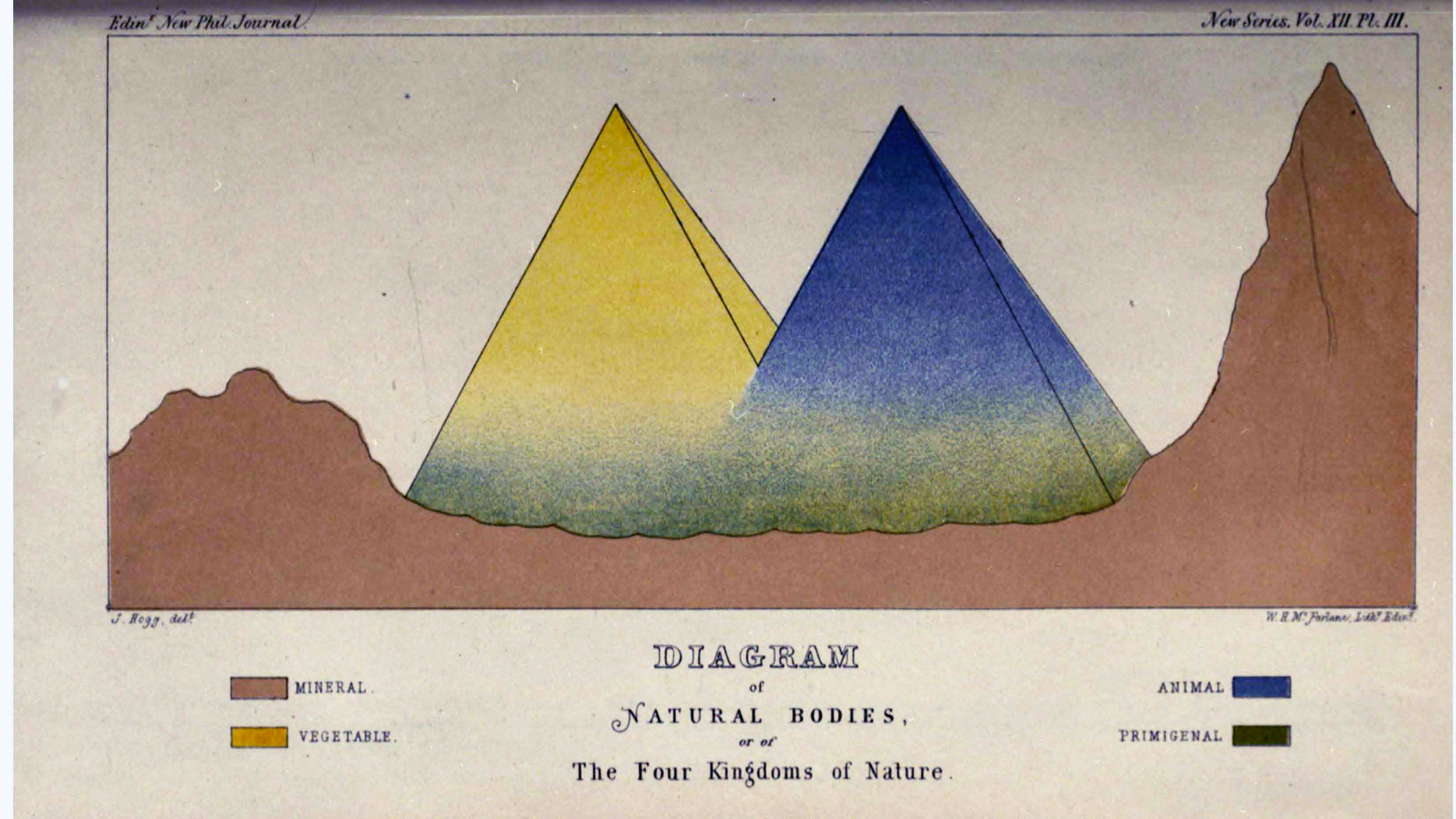
John Hogg's illustration of the Four Kingdoms of Nature, showing "Primigenal" as a greenish haze at the base of the Animals and Plants, 1860

As a phylum under Animalia, the Protozoa were firmly rooted in a simplistic "two-kingdom" concept of life, according to which all living beings were classified as either animals or plants. As long as this scheme remained dominant, the protozoa were understood to be animals and studied in departments of Zoology, while photosynthetic microorganisms and microscopic fungi—the so-called Protophyta—were assigned to the Plants, and studied in departments of Botany.

Criticism of this system began in the latter half of the 19th century, with the realization that many organisms met the criteria for inclusion among both plants and animals. For example, the algae Euglena and Dinobryon have chloroplasts for photosynthesis, like plants, but can also feed on organic matter and are motile, like animals. In 1860, John Hogg argued against the use of "protozoa", on the grounds that "naturalists are divided in opinion—and probably some will ever continue so—whether many of these organisms or living beings, are animals or plants." As an alternative, he proposed a new kingdom called Primigenum, consisting of both the protozoa and unicellular algae, which he combined under the name "Protoctista". In Hoggs's conception, the animal and plant kingdoms were likened to two great "pyramids" blending at their bases in the kingdom Primigenum.

In 1866, Ernst Haeckel proposed a third kingdom of life, which he named Protista. At first, Haeckel included a few multicellular organisms in this kingdom, but in later work, he restricted the Protista to single-celled organisms, or simple colonies whose individual cells are not differentiated into different kinds of tissues.

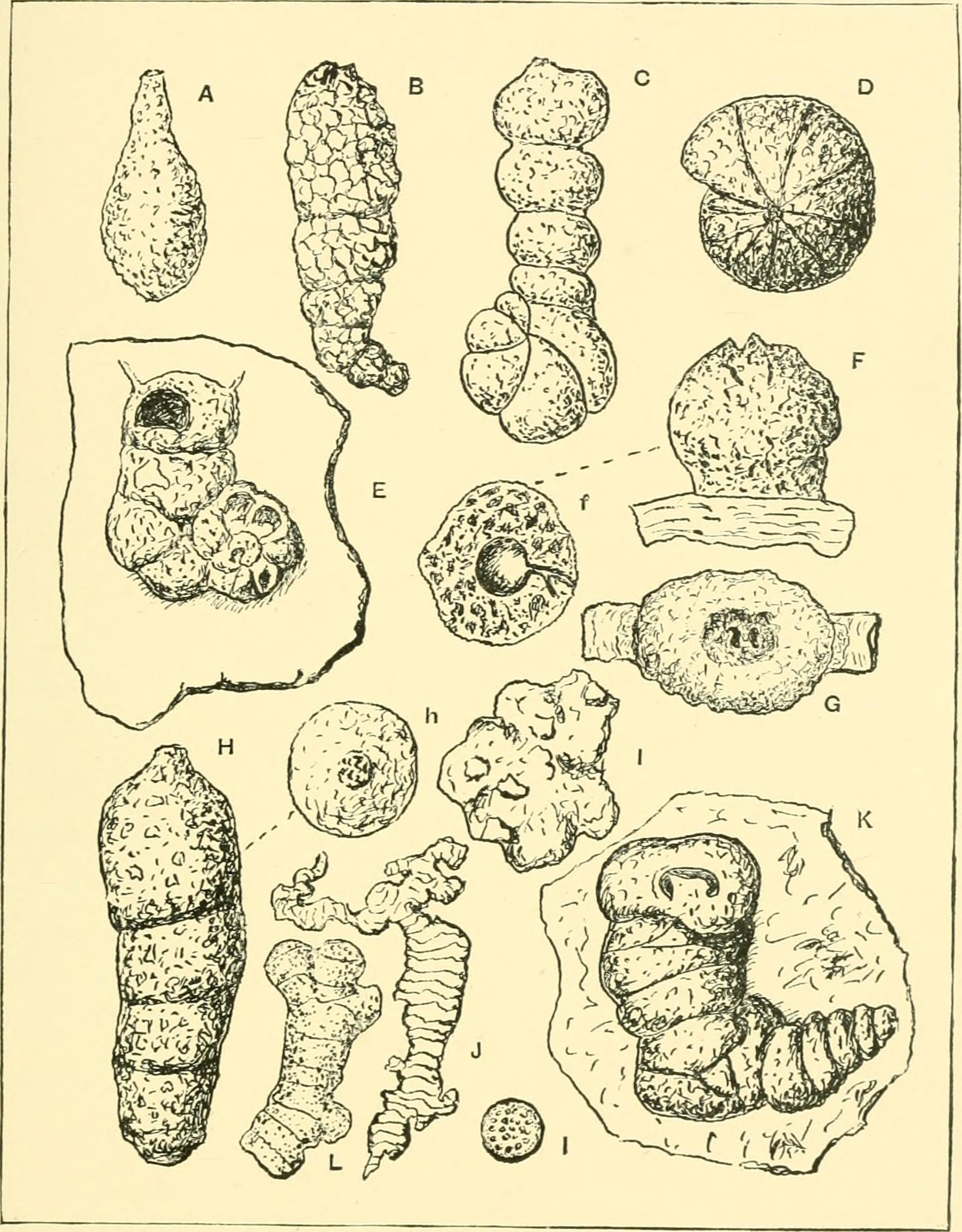
Frederick Chapman's The foraminifera: an introduction to the study of the protozoa (1902)

Despite these proposals, Protozoa emerged as the preferred taxonomic placement for heterotrophic microorganisms such as amoebae and ciliates, and remained so for more than a century. In the course of the 20th century, the old "two kingdom" system began to weaken, with the growing awareness that fungi did not belong among the plants, and that most of the unicellular protozoa were no more closely related to the animals than they were to the plants. By mid-century, some biologists, such as Herbert Copeland, Robert H. Whittaker and Lynn Margulis, advocated the revival of Haeckel's Protista or Hogg's Protoctista as a kingdom-level eukaryotic group, alongside Plants, Animals and Fungi. A variety of multi-kingdom systems were proposed, and the kingdoms Protista and Protoctista became established in biology texts and curricula.

By 1954, Protozoa were classified as "unicellular animals", as distinct from the "Protophyta", single-celled photosynthetic algae, which were considered primitive plants. In the system of classification published in 1964 by B.M. Honigsberg and colleagues, the phylum Protozoa was divided according to the means of locomotion, such as by cilia or flagella.

Despite awareness that the traditional Protozoa was not a clade, a natural group with a common ancestor, some authors have continued to use the name, while applying it to differing scopes of organisms. In a series of classifications by Thomas Cavalier-Smith and collaborators since 1981, the taxon Protozoa was applied to certain groups of eukaryotes, and ranked as a kingdom. A scheme presented by Ruggiero et al. in 2015, placed eight not closely related phyla within kingdom Protozoa: Euglenozoa, Amoebozoa, Metamonada, Choanozoa sensu Cavalier-Smith, Loukozoa, Percolozoa, Microsporidia and Sulcozoa. This approach excludes several major groups traditionally placed among the protozoa, such as the ciliates, dinoflagellates, foraminifera, and the parasitic apicomplexans, which were moved to other groups such as Alveolata and Stramenopiles, under the polyphyletic Chromista. The Protozoa in this scheme were paraphyletic, because it excluded some descendants of Protozoa.

The continued use by some of the 'Protozoa' in its old sense highlights the uncertainty as to what is meant by the word 'Protozoa', the need for disambiguating statements such as "in the sense intended by Goldfuß", and the problems that arise when new meanings are given to familiar taxonomic terms. Some authors classify Protozoa as a subgroup of mostly motile protists. Others class any unicellular eukaryotic microorganism as protists, and make no reference to 'Protozoa'. In 2005, members of the Society of Protozoologists voted to change its name to the International Society of Protistologists.

In the system of eukaryote classification published by the International Society of Protistologists in 2012, members of the old phylum Protozoa have been distributed among a variety of supergroups.

== Phylogenetic distribution ==
Protists are distributed across all major groups of eukaryotes, including those that contain multicellular algae, green plants, animals, and fungi. If photosynthetic and fungal protists are distinguished from protozoa, they appear as shown in the phylogenetic tree of eukaryotic groups. The Metamonada are hard to place, being sister possibly to Discoba, possibly to Malawimonada.

- Eukaryotes
  - - Ancyromonadida FLAGELLATE PROTOZOA
    - - Malawimonada FLAGELLATE PROTOZOA
      - - CRuMs PROTOZOA, often FLAGELLATE
        - Amorphea
          - Amoebozoa AMOEBOID PROTOZOA
          - - Breviatea PARASITIC PROTOZOA
            - - Apusomonadida FLAGELLATE PROTOZOA
              - - Holomycota (inc. multicellular fungi) FUNGAL PROTISTS
                - Holozoa (inc. multicellular animals) AMOEBOID PROTOZOA
  - Diphoda Bikonts
    - - ? Metamonada FLAGELLATE PROTOZOA
      - Discoba EUGLENOID PROTISTS (some photosynthetic), FLAGELLATE/AMOEBOID PROTOZOA
    - Diaphoretickes
      - - Cryptista PROTISTS (algae)
        - Archaeplastida
          - - Rhodophyta (multicellular red algae) PROTISTS (red algae)
            - Picozoa PROTISTS (algae)
          - - Glaucophyta PROTISTS (algae)
            - Viridiplantae (inc. multicellular plants) PROTISTS (green algae)
      - - Hemimastigophora FLAGELLATE PROTOZOA
        - - Provora FLAGELLATE PROTOZOA
          - - Haptista PROTOZOA
            - TSAR
              - Telonemia FLAGELLATE PROTOZOA
              - SAR
                - Rhizaria PROTOZOA, often AMOEBOID
                - - Alveolata PROTOZOA
                  - Stramenopiles FLAGELLATE PROTISTS (photosynthetic)

== Characteristics ==
=== Reproduction ===
Reproduction in Protozoa can be sexual or asexual. Most Protozoa reproduce asexually through binary fission.

Many parasitic Protozoa reproduce both asexually and sexually. However, sexual reproduction is rare among free-living protozoa and it usually occurs when food is scarce or the environment changes drastically. Both isogamy and anisogamy occur in Protozoa, anisogamy being the more common form of sexual reproduction.

=== Size ===
Protozoans, as traditionally defined, range in size from as little as 1 micrometre to several millimetres, or more. Among the largest are the deep-sea–dwelling xenophyophores, single-celled foraminifera whose shells can reach 20 cm in diameter.

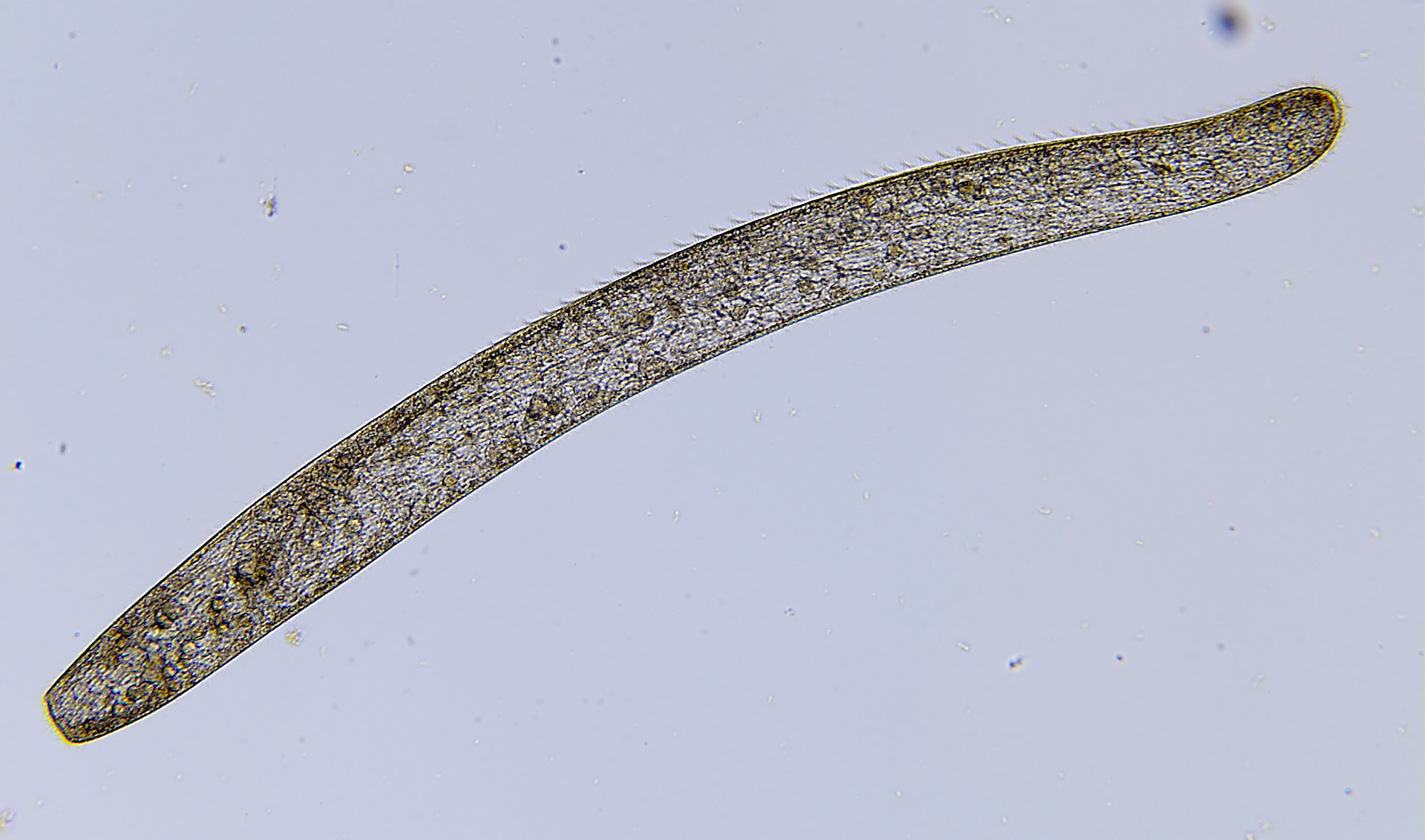
The ciliate Spirostomum ambiguum can attain 3 mm in length

Species	Cell type	Size in micrometres
Plasmodium falciparum	malaria parasite, trophozoite phase	1–2
Massisteria voersi	free-living Cercozoa cercomonad amoebo-flagellate	2.3–3
Bodo saltans	free-living kinetoplastid flagellate	5–8
Plasmodium falciparum	malaria parasite, gametocyte phase	7–14
Trypanosoma cruzi	parasitic kinetoplastid, Chagas disease	14–24
Entamoeba histolytica	parasitic amoeban	15–60
Balantidium coli	parasitic ciliate	50–100
Paramecium caudatum	free-living ciliate	120–330
Amoeba proteus	free-living amoebozoan	220–760
Noctiluca scintillans	free-living dinoflagellate	700–2000
Syringammina fragilissima	foraminifera amoeba	up to 200000

=== Habitat ===
Free-living protozoa are common and often abundant in fresh, brackish and salt water, as well as other moist environments, such as soils and mosses. Some species thrive in extreme environments such as hot springs and hypersaline lakes and lagoons. All protozoa require a moist habitat; however, some can survive for long periods of time in dry environments, by forming resting cysts that enable them to remain dormant until conditions improve.

=== Feeding ===
All protozoa are heterotrophic, deriving nutrients from other organisms, either by ingesting them whole by phagocytosis or taking up dissolved organic matter or micro-particles (osmotrophy). Phagocytosis may involve engulfing organic particles with pseudopodia (as amoebae do), taking in food through a specialized mouth-like aperture called a cytostome, or using stiffened ingestion organelles

Parasitic protozoa use a wide variety of feeding strategies, and some may change methods of feeding in different phases of their life cycle. For instance, the malaria parasite Plasmodium feeds by pinocytosis during its immature trophozoite stage of life (ring phase), but develops a dedicated feeding organelle (cytostome) as it matures within a host's red blood cell.

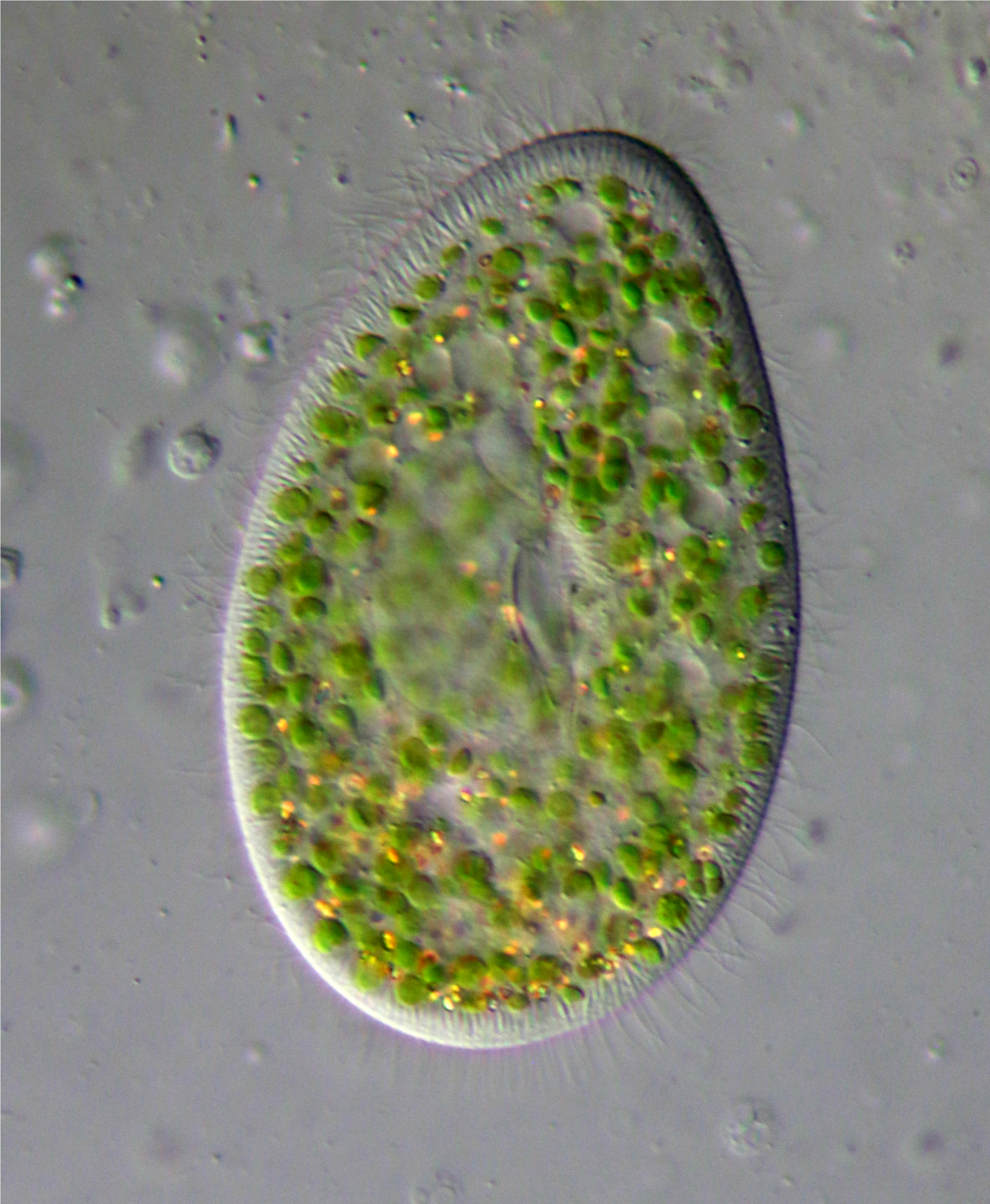
Paramecium bursaria, is one example of a variety of freshwater ciliates that host endosymbiont chlorophyte algae from the genus Chlorella

Protozoa may also live as mixotrophs, combining a heterotrophic diet with some form of autotrophy. Some protozoa form close associations with symbiotic photosynthetic algae (zoochlorellae), which live and grow within the membranes of the larger cell and provide nutrients to the host. The algae are not digested, but reproduce and are distributed between division products. The organism may benefit at times by deriving some of its nutrients from the algal endosymbionts or by surviving anoxic conditions because of the oxygen produced by algal photosynthesis. Some protozoans practice kleptoplasty, stealing chloroplasts from prey organisms and maintaining them within their own cell bodies as they continue to produce nutrients through photosynthesis. The ciliate Mesodinium rubrum retains functioning plastids from the cryptophyte algae on which it feeds, using them to nourish themselves by autotrophy. The symbionts may be passed along to dinoflagellates of the genus Dinophysis, which prey on Mesodinium rubrum but keep the enslaved plastids for themselves. Within Dinophysis, these plastids can continue to function for months.

=== Motility ===
Organisms traditionally classified as protozoa are abundant in aqueous environments and soil, occupying a range of trophic levels. The group includes flagellates (which move with the help of undulating and beating flagella). Ciliates (which move by using hair-like structures called cilia) and amoebae (which move by the use of temporary extensions of cytoplasm called pseudopodia). Many protozoa, such as the agents of amoebic meningitis, use both pseudopodia and flagella. Some protozoa attach to the substrate or form cysts, so they do not move around (sessile). Most sessile protozoa are able to move around at some stage in the life cycle, such as after cell division. The term 'theront' has been used for actively motile phases, as opposed to 'trophont' or 'trophozoite' that refers to feeding stages.

=== Walls, pellicles, scales, and skeletons ===
Pellicles of protozoa

Unlike plants, fungi and most types of algae, most protozoa do not have a rigid external cell wall but are usually enveloped by elastic structures of membranes that permit movement of the cell. In some protozoa, such as the ciliates and euglenozoans, the outer membrane of the cell is supported by a cytoskeletal infrastructure, known as a pellicle. The pellicle gives shape to the cell, especially during locomotion. Pellicles of protozoan organisms vary from flexible and elastic to fairly rigid. In ciliates and Apicomplexa, the pellicle includes a layer of closely packed vesicles called alveoli. In euglenids, the pellicle is formed from protein strips arranged spirally along the length of the body. Familiar examples of protists with a pellicle are the euglenoids and the ciliate Paramecium. In some protozoa, the pellicle hosts epibiotic bacteria that adhere to the surface by their fimbriae (attachment pili).

Some protozoa live within loricas – loose fitting but not fully intact enclosures. For example, many collar flagellates (Choanoflagellates) have an organic lorica or a lorica made from silicous sectretions. Loricas are also common among some green euglenids, various ciliates (such as the folliculinids, various testate amoebae and foraminifera. The surfaces of a variety of protozoa are covered with a layer of scales and or spicules. Examples include the amoeba Cochliopodium, many centrohelid heliozoa, synurophytes. The layer is often assumed to have a protective role. In some, such as the actinophryid heliozoa, the scales only form when the organism encysts. The bodies of some protozoa are supported internally by rigid, often inorganic, elements (as in Acantharea, Pylocystinea, Phaeodarea – collectively the 'Radiolaria', and Ebriida).

=== Life cycle ===
Protozoa mostly reproduce asexually by binary fission or multiple fission. Many protozoa also exchange genetic material by sexual means (typically, through conjugation), but this is generally decoupled from reproduction. Meiotic sex is widespread among eukaryotes, and must have originated early in their evolution, as it has been found in many protozoan lineages that diverged early in eukaryotic evolution.

=== Aging ===
In the well-studied protozoan species Paramecium tetraurelia, the asexual line undergoes clonal aging, loses vitality and expires after about 200 fissions if the cells fail to undergo autogamy or conjugation. The functional basis for clonal aging was clarified by transplantation experiments of Aufderheide in 1986. These experiments demonstrated that the macronucleus, and not the cytoplasm, is responsible for clonal aging.

Additional experiments by Smith-Sonneborn, Holmes and Holmes, and Gilley and Blackburn showed that, during clonal aging, DNA damage increases dramatically. Thus, DNA damage in the macronucleus appears to be the principal cause of clonal aging in P. tetraurelia. In this single-celled protozoan, aging appears to proceed in a manner similar to that of multicellular eukaryotes (see DNA damage theory of aging).

== Ecology ==
=== Free-living ===
Free-living protozoa are found in almost all ecosystems that contain free water, permanently or temporarily. They have a critical role in the mobilization of nutrients in ecosystems. Within the microbial food web they include the most important bacterivores. In part, they facilitate the transfer of bacterial and algal production to successive trophic levels, but also they solubilize the nutrients within microbial biomass, allowing stimulation of microbial growth. As consumers, protozoa prey upon unicellular or filamentous algae, bacteria, microfungi, and micro-carrion. In the context of older ecological models of the micro- and meiofauna, protozoa may be a food source for microinvertebrates.

Most species of free-living protozoa live in similar habitats in all parts of the world.

=== Parasitism ===
Many protozoan pathogens are human parasites, causing serious diseases such as malaria, giardiasis, toxoplasmosis, and sleeping sickness. Some of these protozoa have two-phase life cycles, alternating between proliferative stages (e.g., trophozoites) and resting cysts, enabling them to survive harsh conditions.

=== Commensalism ===
A wide range of protozoa live commensally in the rumens of ruminant animals, such as cattle and sheep. These include flagellates, such as Trichomonas, and ciliated protozoa, such as Isotricha and Entodinium. The ciliate subclass Astomatia is composed entirely of mouthless symbionts adapted for life in the guts of annelid worms.

=== Mutualism ===
Association between protozoan symbionts and their host organisms can be mutually beneficial. Flagellated protozoa such as Trichonympha and Pyrsonympha inhabit the guts of termites, where they enable their insect host to digest wood by helping to break down complex sugars into smaller, more easily digested molecules.

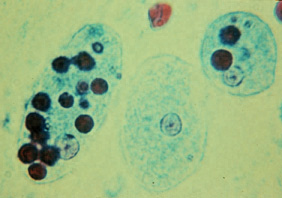
Trophozoites of Entamoeba histolytica, a disease-causing parasite with engulfed red blood cells (dark circles)

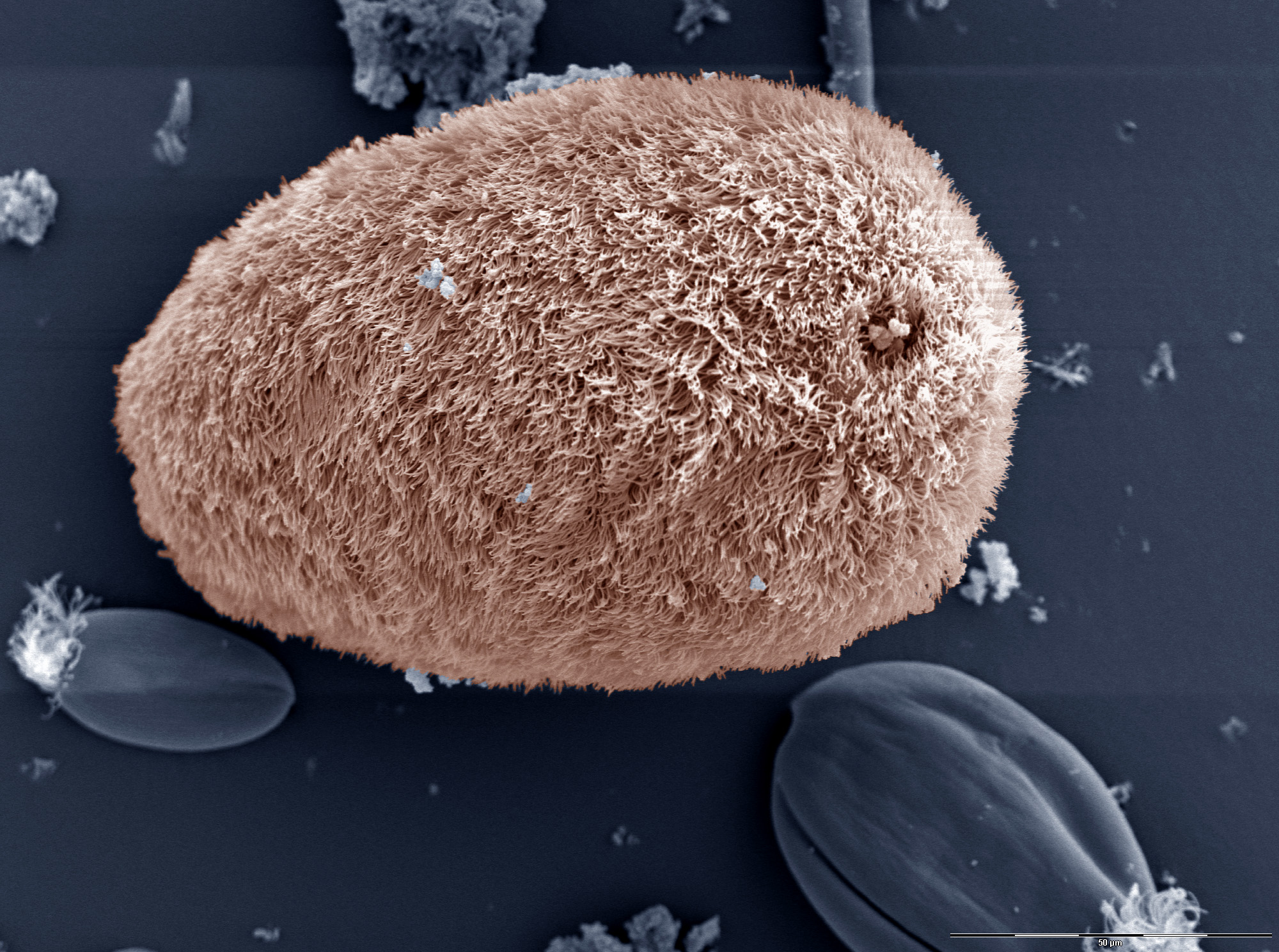
Isotricha intestinalis, a commensal ciliate in the rumen of sheep

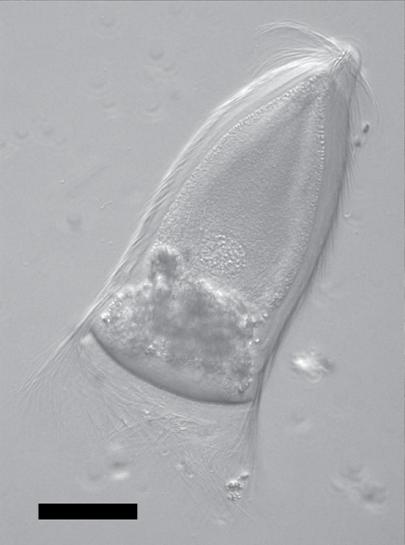
Trichonympha campanula, a mutualist partner of termites

== Bibliography ==
General

- Dogiel, V. A., revised by J.I. Poljanskij and E. M. Chejsin. General Protozoology, 2nd ed., Oxford University Press, 1965.
- Hausmann, K., N. Hulsmann. Protozoology. Thieme Verlag; New York, 1996.
- Kudo, R.R. Protozoology. Springfield, IL: C.C. Thomas, 1954; 4th ed.
- Manwell, R.D. Introduction to Protozoology, 2nd rev. ed., Dover Publications Inc.: New York, 1968.
- Roger Anderson, O. Comparative protozoology: ecology, physiology, life history. Berlin [etc.]: Springer-Verlag, 1988.
- Sleigh, M. The Biology of Protozoa. E. Arnold: London, 1981.

Identification

- Jahn, T.L.- Bovee, E.C. & Jahn, F.F. How to Know the Protozoa. Wm. C. Brown Publishers, Div. of McGraw Hill: Dubuque, Iowa, 1979; 2nd ed.
- Lee, J.J., Leedale, G.F. & Bradbury, P. An Illustrated Guide to the Protozoa. Lawrence, KS: Society of Protozoologists, 2000; 2nd ed.
- Patterson, D.J. Free-Living Freshwater Protozoa. A Colour Guide. Manson Publishing: London, 1996.
- Patterson, D.J., M.A. Burford. A Guide to the Protozoa of Marine Aquaculture Ponds. CSIRO Publishing, 2001.

Morphology

- Harrison, F.W., Corliss, J.O. (ed.). 1991. Microscopic Anatomy of Invertebrates, vol. 1, Protozoa. New York: Wiley-Liss, 512 pp.
- Pitelka, D.R. 1963. Electron-Microscopic Structure of Protozoa. Pergamon Press, Oxford.

Physiology and biochemistry

- Nisbet, B. 1984. Nutrition and feeding strategies in Protozoa. Croom Helm Publ.: London, 280 pp.
- Coombs, G.H. & North, M. 1991. Biochemical protozoology. Taylor & Francis, London, Washington.
- Laybourn-Parry J. 1984. A Functional Biology of Free-Living Protozoa. Berkeley, California: University of California Press.
- Levandowski, M., S.H. Hutner (eds). 1979. Biochemistry and physiology of protozoa. Vols. 1, 2, and 3. Academic Press: New York; 2nd ed.
- Sukhareva-Buell, N.N. 2003. Biologically active substances of protozoa. Dordrecht: Kluwer.

Ecology

- Capriulo, G.M. (ed.). 1990. Ecology of Marine Protozoa. Oxford Univ. Press: New York.
- Darbyshire, J.F. (ed.). 1994. Soil Protozoa. CAB International: Wallingford, U.K. 2009 pp.
- Laybourn-Parry, J. 1992. Protozoan plankton ecology. Chapman & Hall: New York. 213 pp.
- Fenchel, T. 1987. Ecology of protozoan: The biology of free-living phagotrophic protists. Springer-Verlag: Berlin. 197 pp.

Parasitology

- Kreier, J.P. (ed.). 1991–1995. Parasitic Protozoa, 2nd ed. 10 vols (1–3 coedited by Baker, J.R.). Academic Press: San Diego, CA, .

Methods

- Lee, J.J., & Soldo, A.T. (1992). Protocols in protozoology. Lawrence, KS: Society of Protozoologists,.
