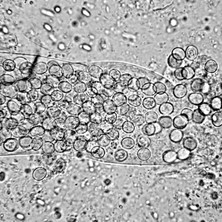
- Amoeba under the microscope in the Malpighian tubules of bees

Scientific classification
- Domain: Eukaryota
- Phylum: Amoebozoa
- Class: Tubulinea
- Order: Tubulinida
- Family: Amoebidae
- Genus: Malpighamoeba
- Species: M. mellificae

Binomial name
- Malpighamoeba mellificae Prell, 1926

= Malpighamoeba mellificae =

Species of protozoan

Malpighamoeba mellificae is a single-celled parasite which affects excretory organs (Malpighian tubules) of adult bees, causing the contagious disease called amoebiasis, which ultimately leads to death of the host. Worker bees are most prone to being infected. It is commonly found in collaboration with nosemosis. In order to diagnose the 3 - 15 μm size parasite, removal of the malphigian tubule is necessary. Because of there being no viable treatment against this parasite, preventional measures such as providing a clean food supply for the hive are crucial.

== Size, means of movement, and nutrition ==
Although molecular data is sparse, it is known that the size of Malpighamoeba mellificae can reach from 3 - 15 μm. The function of locomotion is executed by a lash-like appendage called flagellum or pseudopodia. In order for the amoeba to get nutrients, endocytosis is utilized.

== Transmission ==
The disease is most commonly found in Europe, Oceania, and America, as the amoeba only attacks the western honey bee (Apis mellifera). Infection and transmission is the same as in nosemosis. Transmission occurs through cysts, which are constructed by the amoeba. Usual ways of transmission are by feeding of larvae by worker bees or through feces, where the cysts can survive up to one month. Drones and queen bees are mostly unaffected. Infected bees can spread the disease further by traveling off to other hives.

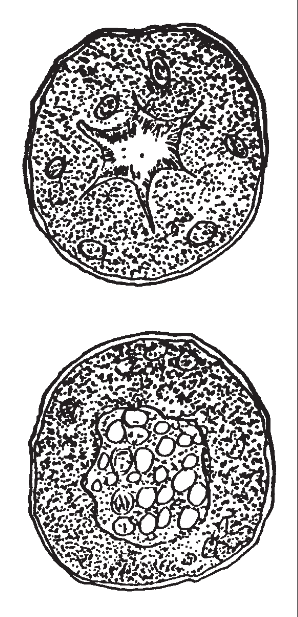
Cross section of Malpighian tubule. The bottom tubule infested with M. mellificae

== Diagnosis ==
The parasites are found in the feces or the malphigian tubules of the bees. Microscopical examination of a tubule is necessary for the positive diagnosis of the disease. Therefore, removal of the malphigian tubules is an important step in diagnosing the parasite. They can be detached from the digestive tract with tweezers and need to be put on a microscope slide for examination. Cysts should be observed with a microscope, which can be seen ranging from 5 - 8 μm. Further attention should be paid to swelling of the striated border on the epithelium. The border can be damaged or completely consumed by the parasite.

== Symptoms ==
Typically, there will be an unusual increase in the mortality rate for bees. Attention should be paid to the behavior of the bees as they will start to show signs of weakness, such as shaking their wings without an uplift into the air. Furthermore, feces will be yellow and fluid, while emitting a strong smell.

== Prevention and treatment ==
Feeding the hive with honey should be avoided as it can amplify the risk of infection spreading as well as attracting potential robber bees, which can carry diseases to the hive. Clean water should be provided at all times.

There is no viable treatment against M. mellificae. Weak populations have a chance of self-recovery. Strongly infested populations need to be killed off to avoid the further spreading of the disease. Special attention should be put into the removal of dead bees, feces-infected honeycombs and proper sanitation inside the hive.

== See also ==
- Nosema apis
- Amoebiasis
