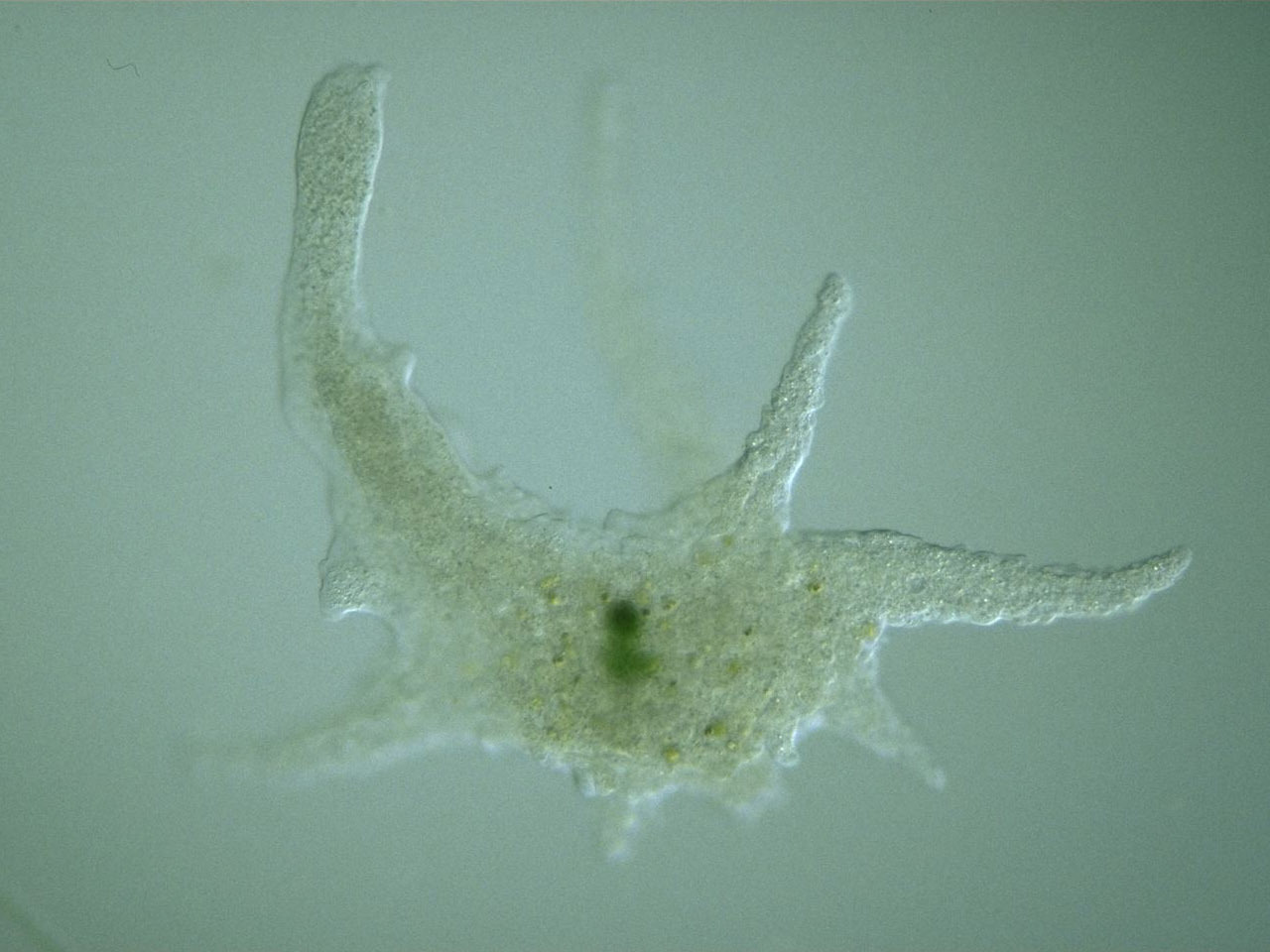
- Chaos carolinense

Scientific classification
- Domain: Eukaryota
- Supergroup: Amorphea
- Phylum: Amoebozoa
- Class: Tubulinea
- Order: Euamoebida
- Family: Amoebidae
- Genus: Chaos; Linnaeus, 1767

Type species
- Chaos proteus (Pallas 1766) Linnaeus 1767

Species
- C. carolinense (Wilson, 1900) King & Jahn 1948; C. glabrum Smirnov & Goodkov 1997; C. illinoisense (Kudo, 1950) Bovee & Jahn 1973; C. nobile (Penard, 1902) Bovee & Jahn 1973; C. zoochlorellae Willumsen 1982

Synonyms
- Cahos Bory de St.Vincent, 1823; Caos Brera, 1811

= Chaos (genus) =

Genus of microscopic organisms

Chaos is a genus of single-celled amoeboid organisms in the family Amoebidae. The largest and best-known species, the so-called "giant amoeba" (Chaos carolinense), can reach lengths up to 5 mm, although most specimens fall between 1 and 3 mm.

Members of this genus closely resemble those of the genus Amoeba and share the same general morphology, producing numerous cylindrical pseudopods, each of which is rounded at the tip. However, while Amoeba have a single nucleus, Chaos can have as many as a thousand. Because of this attribute, C. carolinense was once placed in the genus Pelomyxa alongside the giant multinucleate amoeba Pelomyxa palustris. Recently, molecular phylogenetic studies of this species have confirmed the view of some earlier researchers that it is more closely related to Amoeba than to Pelomyxa. The species is now placed in the independent genus Chaos, a sister group to Amoeba.

== Dietary habits ==
Chaos species are versatile heterotrophs, able to feed on bacteria, algae, other protists, and even small multicellular invertebrates. Like all Amoebozoa, they take in food by phagocytosis, encircling food particles with their pseudopodia, then enclosing them within a food ball, or vacuole, where they are broken down by enzymes. The cell does not have a mouth or cytostome, nor is there any fixed site on the cell membrane at which phagocytosis normally occurs.

== Movement ==
The cell's membrane, or plasmalemma, is extremely flexible, allowing the organism to change shape from one moment to the next. The cytoplasm within the membrane is conventionally described as having two parts: the internal fluid, or endoplasm, which contains loose granules and food vacuoles, as well as organelles such as nuclei and mitochondria; and a more viscous ectoplasm around the perimeter of the cell, which is relatively clear and contains no conspicuous granules. Like other lobose amoebae, Chaos move by extending pseudopodia. As a new pseudopod is extended, a variable zone of ectoplasm forms at the leading edge and a fountaining stream of endoplasm circulates within. The effort of describing these motions, and explaining how they result in the cell's forward movement, has generated a large body of scientific literature.

== Early history and naming controversy ==
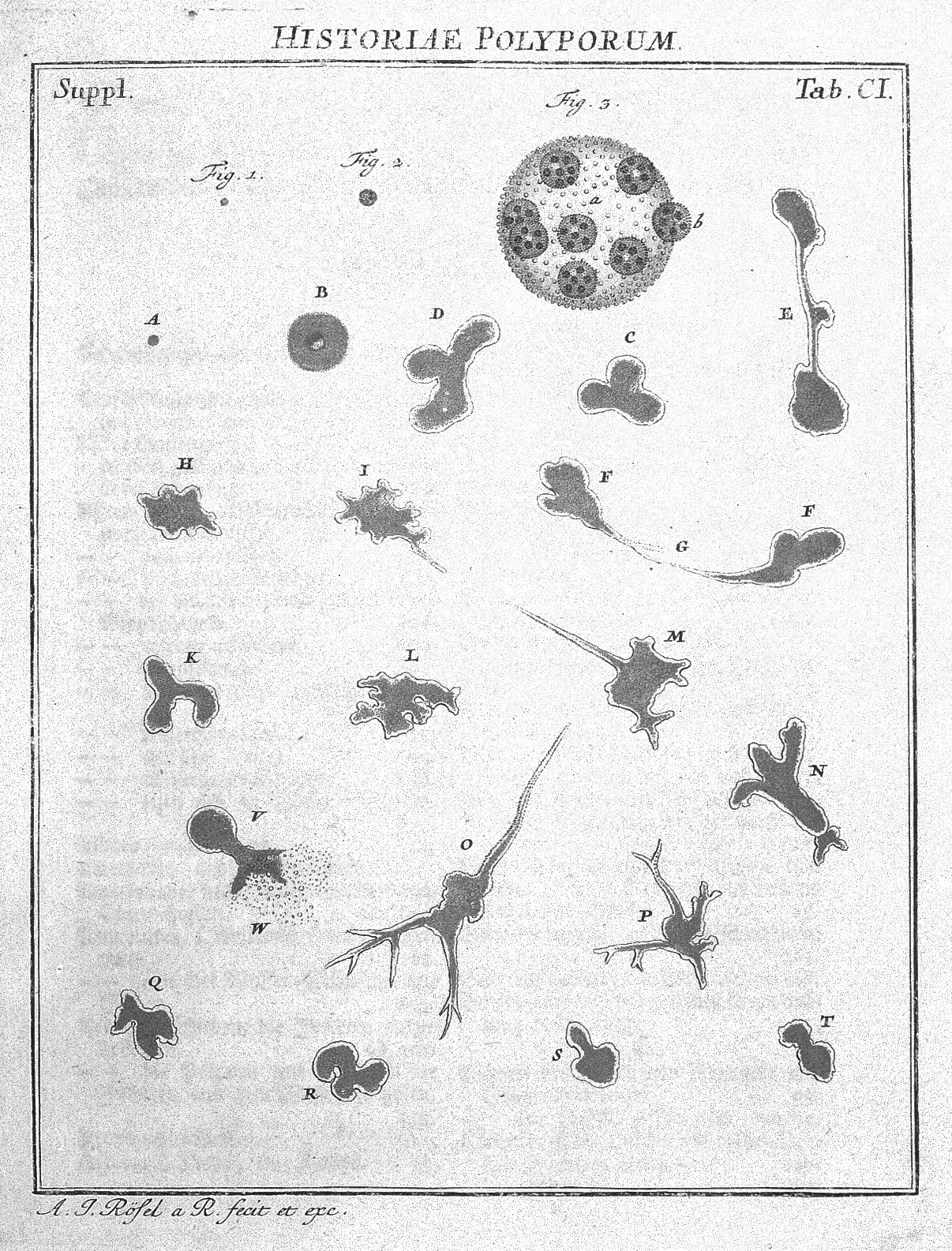
Amoebas and Volvox from Rösel von Rosenhof, 1755

The genus Chaos has had a long and often confusing history. In 1755, Rösel von Rosenhof saw and depicted an amoeboid he named "der kleine Proteus" ("the little Proteus"). Three years later, Linnaeus gave Rösel's creature the name Volvox chaos. However, because the name Volvox had already been applied to a genus of flagellate algae, he later changed it to Chaos chaos. In subsequent decades, as new names and species proliferated, accounts of Chaos, under a variety of synonyms, became so thoroughly entangled with descriptions of similar organisms, that it is virtually impossible to differentiate one historic amoeboid from another. In 1879, Joseph Leidy suggested collapsing all the "common" large, freshwater amoebae into one species, which he proposed to call Amoeba proteus. A dozen species, including several that had been identified as belonging to Chaos, were to be regarded as synonyms of Amoeba proteus. However, in the description he gives of this organism, it is clearly defined as a uninucleate amoeba, unlike the modern Chaos.

In 1900, the biologist H. V. Wilson, at the University of North Carolina, discovered and isolated a giant amoeba that resembled Amoeba proteus but had cellular nuclei numbering in the hundreds. Since there existed already a genus of giant multinucleate amoebae, Pelomyxa, Wilson placed his organism in that taxon, naming it Pelomyxa carolinensis. This amoeba was easily cultivated and became a widely distributed and studied laboratory organism.

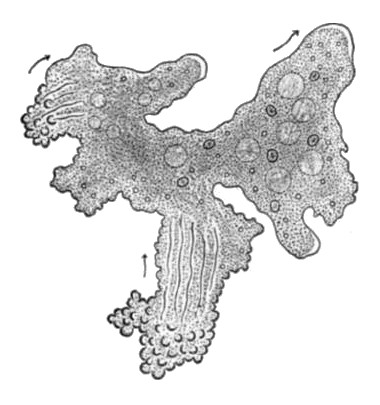
Chaos carolinensis (=Pelomyxa carolinensis), as drawn by H.V. Wilson, 1900

In 1926, Asa A. Schaeffer argued that Pelomyxa carolinensis was, in fact, identical to the amoeba that had been seen by Rösel in 1755, the "little Proteus" which Linnaeus had named Chaos chaos. Therefore, he urged that, in keeping with the principle of priority governing biological nomenclature, the name of the organism should be Chaos chaos. Several investigators argued vigorously against the validity of that name, but others adopted it. A third faction accepted the validity of the genus Chaos for Wilson's amoeba, but retained the second half of the binomial, referring to the organism as Chaos carolinensis. By the early 1970s, all three names were in use concurrently, by various investigators. However, studies of the fine structure and physiology of the amoeba made it increasingly clear that there were profound differences between it and the other Pelomyxa (including the complete absence, in true Pelomyxa, of mitochondria). Since then, a nomenclatural consensus has emerged, and today the organism is generally known as Chaos carolinensis, as first proposed by Robert L. King and Theodore L. Jahn in 1948.

== Recent phylogeny ==
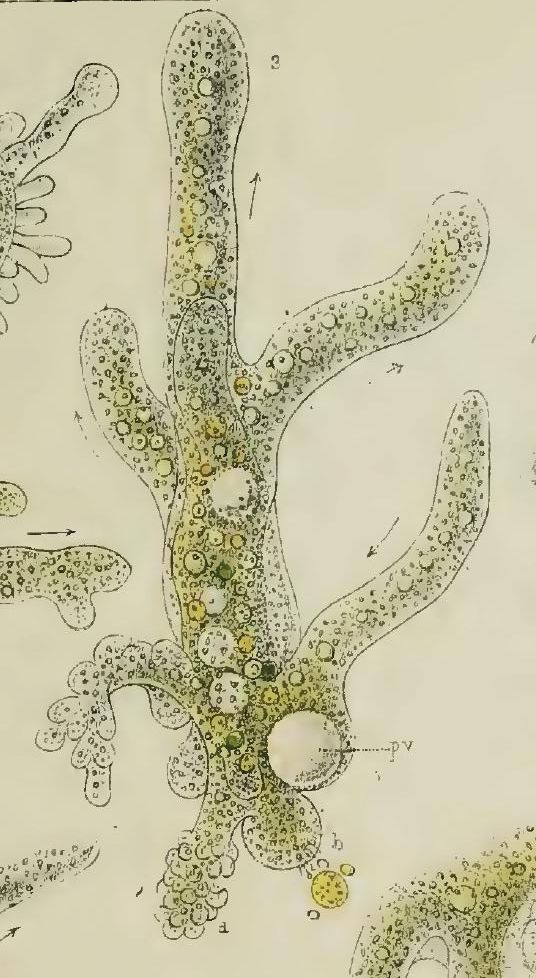
A. proteus (=C. chaos), from Joseph Leidy, 1879

Until quite recently, the genus Chaos was included, along with all other protists that extend lobose pseudopods or move about by protoplasmic flow, in the phylum Sarcodina. Molecular phylogenies based on the examination of ribosomal DNA have shown that Sarcodina is a polyphyletic grouping: that some amoeboids shared a more recent common ancestor with members of other phyla than with other Sarcodina. Consequently, the amoeboids of Sarcodina have been distributed among two newly created supergroups, Rhizaria and Amoebozoa. Chaos and its close relative, Amoeba, are now placed in the latter, within the order Tubulinida: naked amoebas (lacking a test, or shell), either monopodial or possessing somewhat cylindrical pseudopods, with non-adhesive uroid (a region at the posterior of the cell which has a crumpled appearance).

While the monophyly of Amoebozoa has yet to be established, current information confirms the status of Chaos and Amoeba as closely related taxa within the group. However, the same research raises questions about the monophyly of the genus Chaos, since Chaos nobile may be basal to a group containing Chaos carolinense and at least two species of Amoeba, as illustrated below, following Pawlowski and Burki (2009):

- - - Amoeba leningradensis
    - - Amoeba proteus
      - Chaos carolinense
  - Chaos nobile
