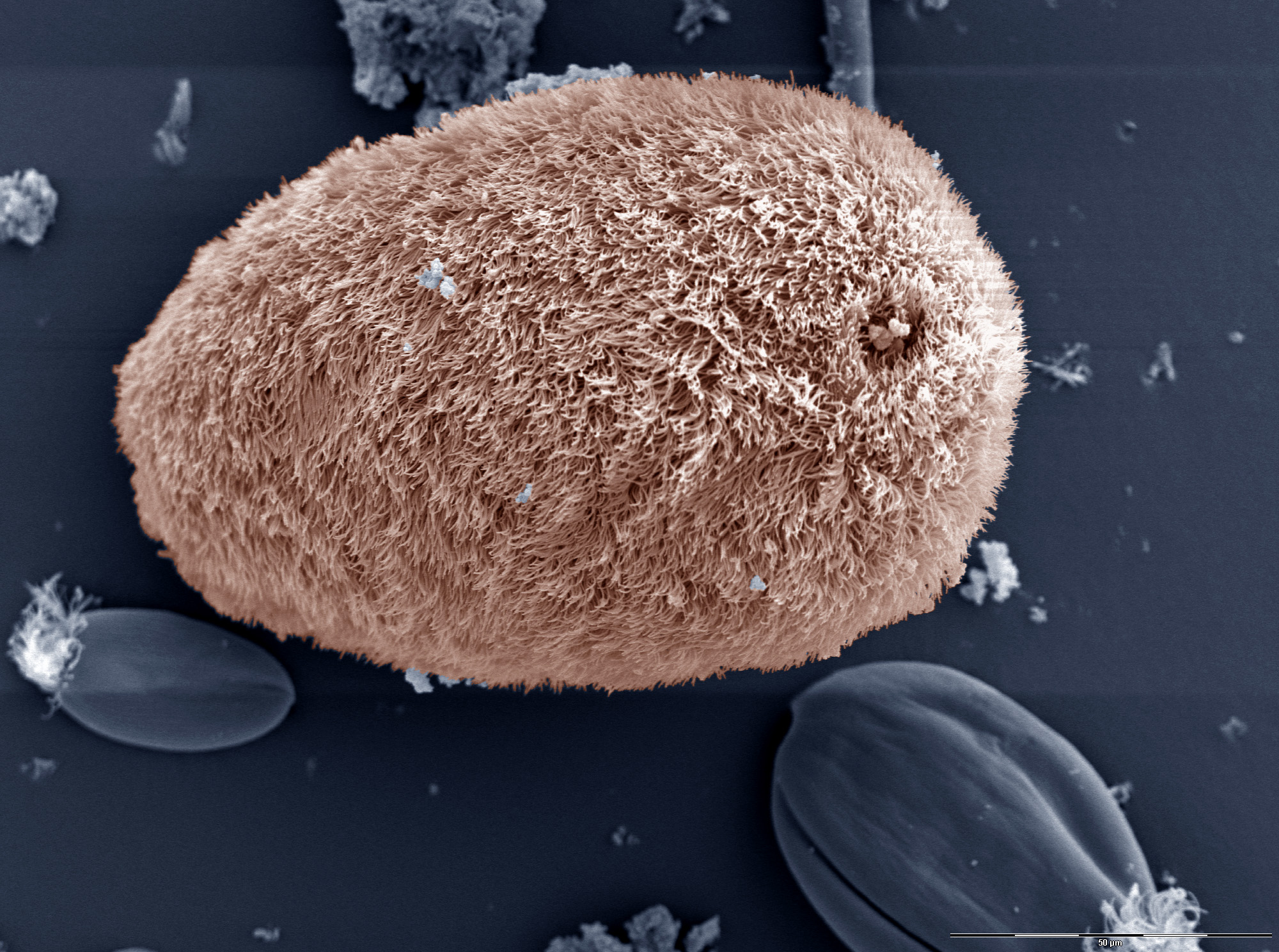

Scientific classification
- Domain: Eukaryota
- Supergroup: Alveolata
- Phylum: Ciliophora
- Class: Litostomatea
- Order: Vestibuliferida
- Family: Isotrichidae
- Genus: Isotricha
- Species: I. intestinalis

Binomial name
- Isotricha intestinalis Stein, 1859

= Isotricha intestinalis =

Species of single-celled organism

Isotricha intestinalis is a species of holotrich protozoa in the class Litostomatea.

== Description ==
Isotricha intestinalis can be 200 micrometers long, and is distinguishable by its mouth position. They are the largest protozoans present in the rumen of sheep. It resembles in appearance another holotrich, Dasytrichia ruminantium. It has microbody-like organelles, and a highly granular appearance. Its mouth, or cytostome, is located on its back ventral surface, with an ovoid 10–15 by 20–30 μm opening. A longitudinal cytoplasmic ridge is present between rows of cilia. The ridge projects about 9 μm from the cell surface.

It exhibits chemotaxis to some soluble carbohydrates and plant material freshly ingested by the host animal. When over 20 μg/mL of soluble protein is present, they attach to particles of plant matter using the ridge. While attached, the cells are able to move along the surface; the attachment is weak and easily dislodged.
