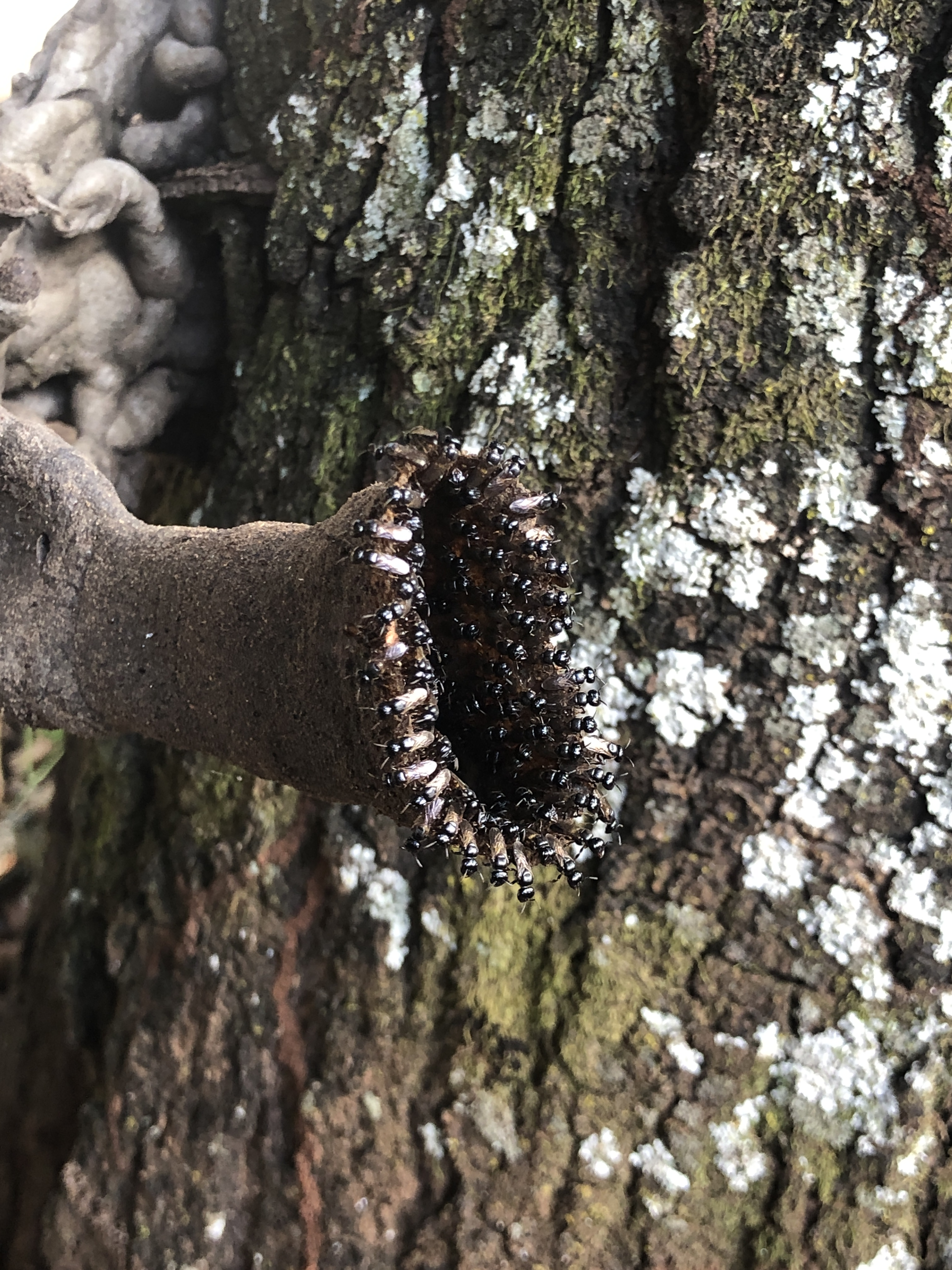

Scientific classification
- Kingdom: Animalia
- Phylum: Arthropoda
- Class: Insecta
- Order: Hymenoptera
- Family: Apidae
- Tribe: Meliponini
- Genus: Lestrimelitta; Friese, 1903

Species
- 24 spp.

= Lestrimelitta =

Genus of bees

Lestrimelitta is a genus of stingless bees found in the Neotropics, from Mexico to Brazil and Argentina, with about 20 known species. They are small, shining black species from 4 to 7 mm in length, with rounded heads and reduced pollen baskets. Unlike most eusocial bees, they do not gather their own pollen and nectar from flowers, thus are not pollinators, but instead they invade the colonies of other stingless bee species and rob their pollen and honey stores (a phenomenon called "cleptobiosis"). They do not initiate their own nests, but they will "evict" another stingless bee colony from its nest (usually in a tree cavity), and convert the pre-existing nest to house their own colony.

== Selected taxa ==
- Lestrimelitta catira(Gonzalez and Griswold, 2012)
- Lestrimelitta chacoana(Roig-Alsina, 2010)
- Lestrimelitta chamelenis(Ayala, 1999)
- Lestrimelitta ciliata(Marchi and Melo, 2006)
- Lestrimelitta danuncia(Oliveira and Marchi, 2005)
- Lestrimelitta ehrhardti(Friese, 1931)
- Lestrimelitta glaberrima(Oliveira and Marchi, 2005)
- Lestrimelitta glabrata(Camargo and Moure, 1990)
- Lestrimelitta guyanensis(Roubik, 1980)
- Lestrimelitta huilensis(Gonzalez and Griswold, 2012)
- Lestrimelitta limao (Smith, 1863) –irati
- Lestrimelitta maracaia(Marchi and Melo, 2006)
- Lestrimelitta monodonta( Camargo and Moure, 1990)
- Lestrimelitta mourei(Oliveira and Marchi, 2005)
- Lestrimelitta nana(Melo, 2003)
- Lestrimelitta niitkib(Ayala, 1999)
- Lestrimelitta opita(Gonzalez and Griswold, 2012)
- Lestrimelitta rufa(Friese, 1903)
- Lestrimelitta rufipes(Friese, 1903)
- Lestrimelitta similis(Marchi and Melo, 2006)
- Lestrimelitta spinosa( Marchi and Melo, 2006)
- Lestrimelitta sulina( Marchi and Melo, 2006)
- Lestrimelitta tropica( Marchi and Melo, 2006)
