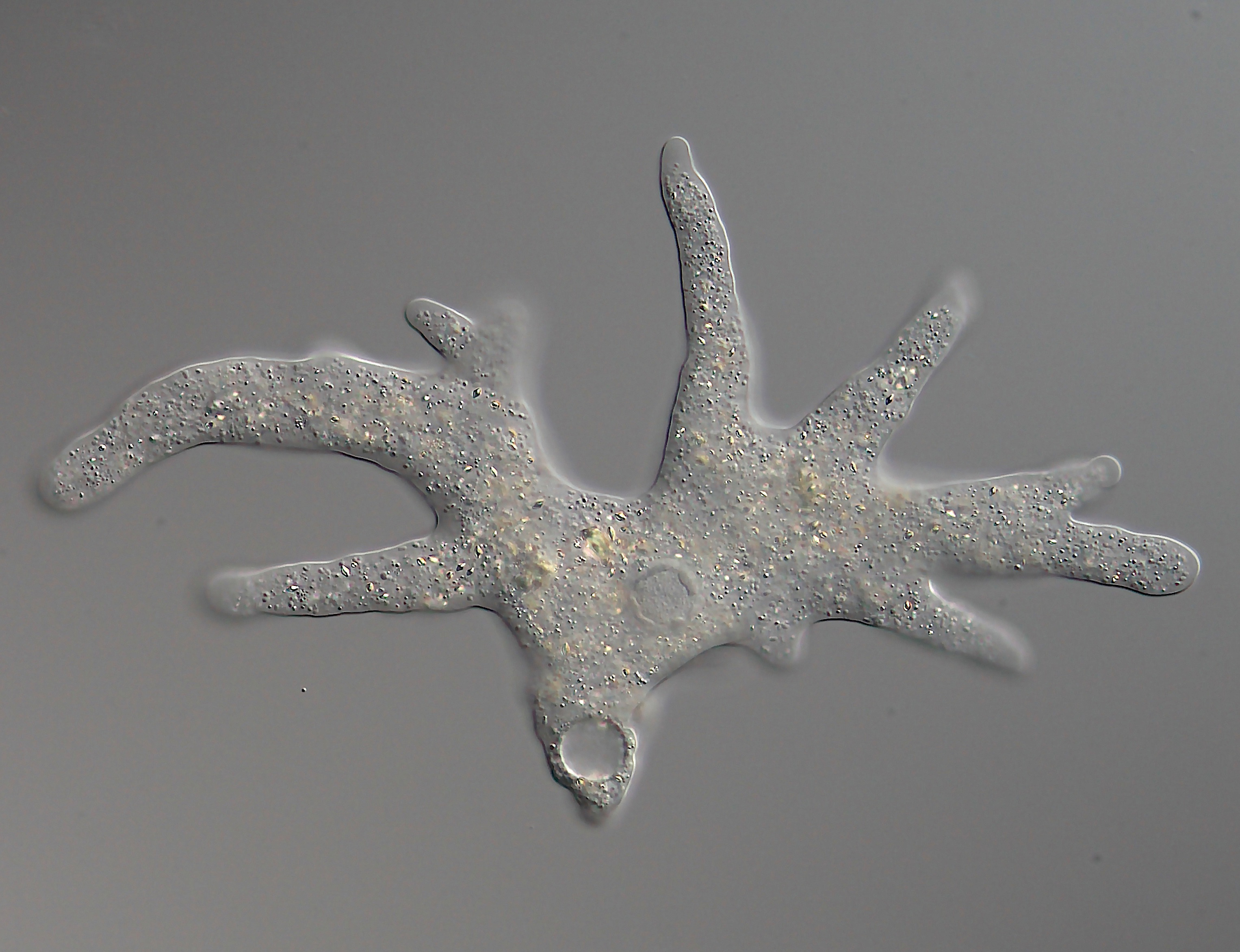
- Amoeba proteus

Scientific classification
- Domain: Eukaryota
- Phylum: Amoebozoa
- Class: Tubulinea
- Order: Euamoebida
- Family: Amoebidae
- Genus: Amoeba; Saint-Vincent, 1822

Species
- Amoeba agilis; Amoeba gorgonia; Amoeba limicola; Amoeba proteus; Amoeba vespertilio

Synonyms
- Proteus Mueller 1786 non Hauser 1885 non Roesel 1755 non Dujardin 1835 non Laurenti 1768; Vibrio Gmelin 1788 non Pacini 1854; Metamoeba Friz, 1992

= Amoeba (genus) =

Genus of Protozoa

Amoeba is a genus of single-celled amoeboids in the family Amoebidae. The type species of the genus is Amoeba proteus, a common freshwater organism, widely studied in classrooms and laboratories.

== History and classification ==
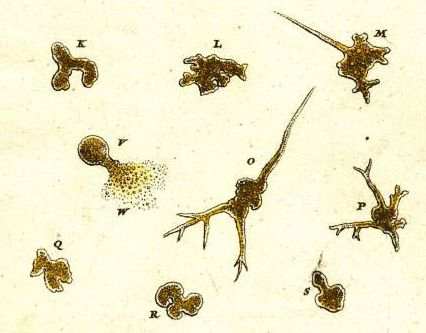
The first illustration of an amoeboid, from Rosenhof's Insecten-Belustigung (1755)

The earliest record of an organism resembling Amoeba was produced in 1755 by August Rosenhof, who named his discovery "der kleine Proteus" ("the little Proteus"), after Proteus, the shape-shifting sea-god of Greek Mythology. While Rösel's illustrations show a creature similar in appearance to the one now known as Amoeba proteus, his "little Proteus'' cannot be identified confidently with any modern species.

The term "Proteus animalcule" remained in use throughout the 18th and 19th centuries, as an informal name for any large, free-living amoeboid.

In 1758, apparently without seeing Rösel's "Proteus" for himself, Carl Linnaeus included the organism in his own system of classification, under the name Volvox chaos. However, because the name Volvox had already been applied to a genus of flagellate algae, he later changed the name to Chaos chaos. In 1786, the Danish Naturalist Otto Müller described and illustrated a species he called Proteus diffluens, which was probably the organism known today as Amoeba proteus.

The genus Amiba, from the Greek amoibè (ἀμοιβή), meaning "change", was erected in 1822 by Jean-Baptiste Saint-Vincent. In 1830, the German naturalist Christian Ehrenberg adopted this genus in his own classification of microscopic creatures, but changed the spelling to "Amoeba."

== Anatomy, feeding and reproduction ==
Anatomy of an Amoeba

Species of Amoeba move and feed by extending temporary structures called pseudopodia. These are formed by the coordinated action of microfilaments within the cellular cytoplasm pushing out the plasma membrane which surrounds the cell. In Amoeba, the pseudopodia are approximately tubular, and rounded at the ends (lobose). The cell's overall shape may change rapidly as pseudopodia are extended and retracted into the cell body. An Amoeba may produce many pseudopodia at once, especially when freely floating. When crawling rapidly along a surface, the cell may take a roughly monopodial form, with a single dominant pseudopod deployed in the direction of movement.

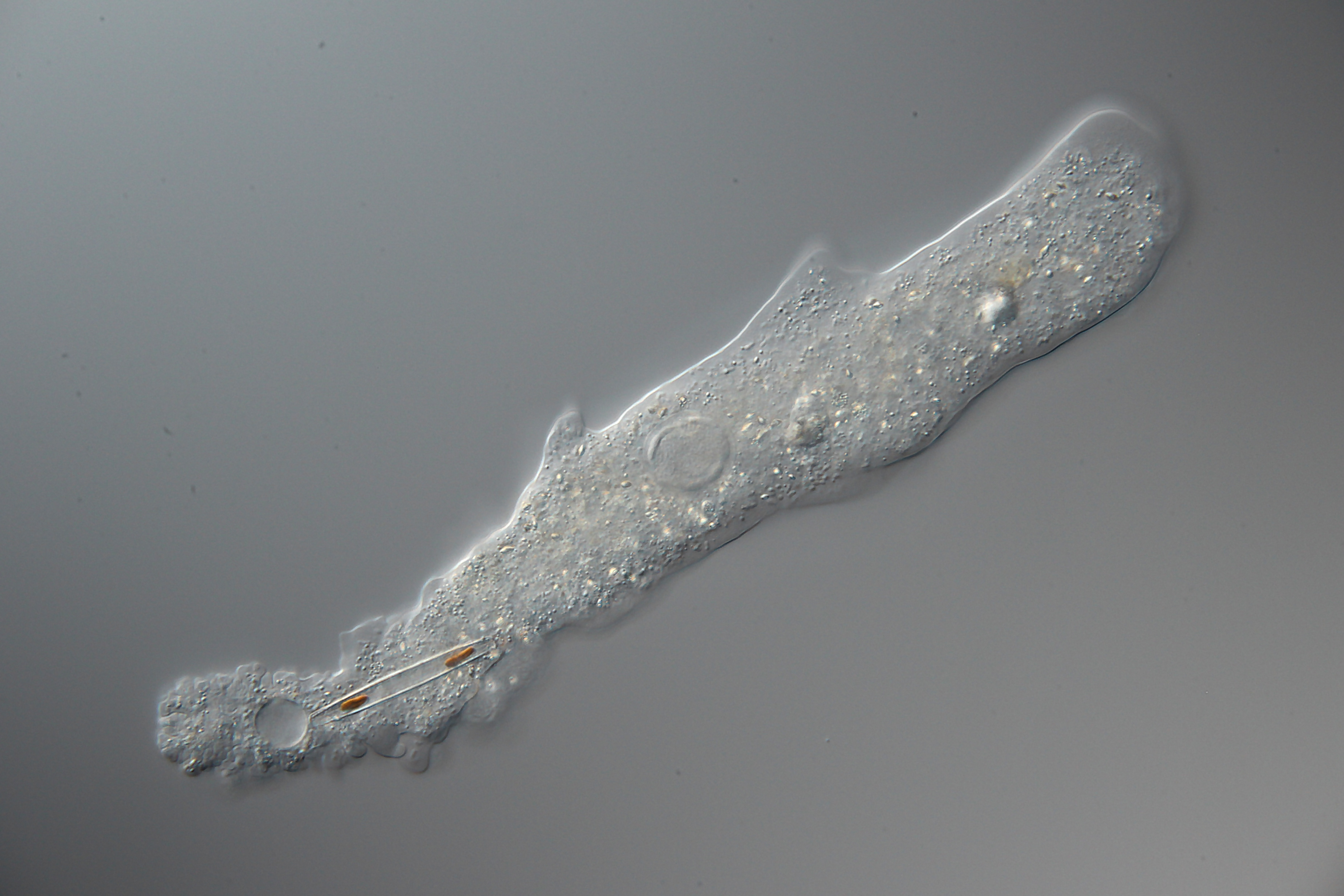
Amoeba proteus in locomotion

Historically, researchers have divided the cytoplasm into two parts, consisting of a granular inner endoplasm and an outer layer of clear ectoplasm, both enclosed within a flexible plasma membrane. The cell usually has a single granular nucleus, containing most of the organism's DNA . A contractile vacuole is used to maintain osmotic equilibrium by excreting excess water from the cell (see Osmoregulation).

An Amoeba obtains its food by phagocytosis, engulfing smaller organisms and particles of organic matter, or by pinocytosis, taking in dissolved nutrients through vesicles formed within the cell membrane. Food enveloped by the Amoeba is stored in digestive organelles called food vacuoles.

Amoeba, like other unicellular eukaryotic organisms, reproduces asexually by mitosis and cytokinesis. Sexual phenomena have not been directly observed in Amoeba, although sexual exchange of genetic material is known to occur in other Amoebozoan groups. Most amoebozoans appear capable of performing syngamy, recombination and ploidy reduction through a standard meiotic process. The “asexual” model organism Amoeba proteus has most of the proteins associated with sexual processes. In cases where organisms are forcibly divided, the portion that retains the nucleus will often survive and form a new cell and cytoplasm, while the other portion dies.

== Osmoregulation ==
Like many other protists, species of Amoeba control osmotic pressures with the help of a membrane-bound organelle called the contractile vacuole. Amoeba proteus has one contractile vacuole which slowly fills with water from the cytoplasm (diastole), then, while fusing with the cell membrane, quickly contracts (systole), releasing water to the outside by exocytosis. This process regulates the amount of water present in the cytoplasm of the amoeba.

Immediately after the contractile vacuole (CV) expels water, its membrane crumples. Soon afterwards, many small vacuoles or vesicles appear surrounding the membrane of the CV. It is suggested that these vesicles split from the CV membrane itself. The small vesicles gradually increase in size as they take in water and then they fuse with the CV, which grows in size as it fills with water. Therefore, the function of these numerous small vesicles is to collect excess cytoplasmic water and channel it to the central CV. The CV swells for a number of minutes and then contracts to expel the water outside. The cycle is then repeated again.

The membranes of the small vesicles as well as the membrane of the CV have aquaporin proteins embedded in them. These transmembrane proteins facilitate water passage through the membranes. The presence of aquaporin proteins in both CV and the small vesicles suggests that water collection occurs both through the CV membrane itself as well as through the function of the vesicles. However, the vesicles, being more numerous and smaller, would allow a faster water uptake due to the larger total surface area provided by the vesicles.

The small vesicles also have another protein embedded in their membrane: vacuolar-type H^{+}-ATPase or V-ATPase. This ATPase pumps H^{+} ions into the vesicle lumen, lowering its pH with respect to the cytosol. However, the pH of the CV in some amoebas is only mildly acidic, suggesting that the H^{+} ions are being removed from the CV or from the vesicles. It is thought that the electrochemical gradient generated by V-ATPase might be used for the transport of ions (it is presumed K^{+} and Cl^{−}) into the vesicles. This builds an osmotic gradient across the vesicle membrane, leading to influx of water from the cytosol into the vesicles by osmosis, which is facilitated by aquaporins.

Since these vesicles fuse with the central contractile vacuole, which expels the water, ions end up being removed from the cell, which is not beneficial for a freshwater organism. The removal of ions with the water has to be compensated by some yet-unidentified mechanism.

Like other eukaryotes, Amoeba species are adversely affected by excessive osmotic pressure caused by extremely saline or dilute water. In saline water, an Amoeba will prevent the influx of salt, resulting in a net loss of water as the cell becomes isotonic with the environment, causing the cell to shrink. Placed into fresh water, Amoeba will match the concentration of the surrounding water, causing the cell to swell. If the surrounding water is too dilute, the cell may burst.

== Amoeba cysts ==
In environments that are potentially lethal to the cell, an Amoeba may become dormant by forming itself into a ball and secreting a protective membrane to become a microbial cyst. The cell remains in this state until it encounters more favourable conditions. While in cyst form the amoeba will not replicate and may die if unable to emerge for a lengthy period of time.

== Video gallery ==
Amoeba proteus in motion

Amoeba engulfing a diatom
