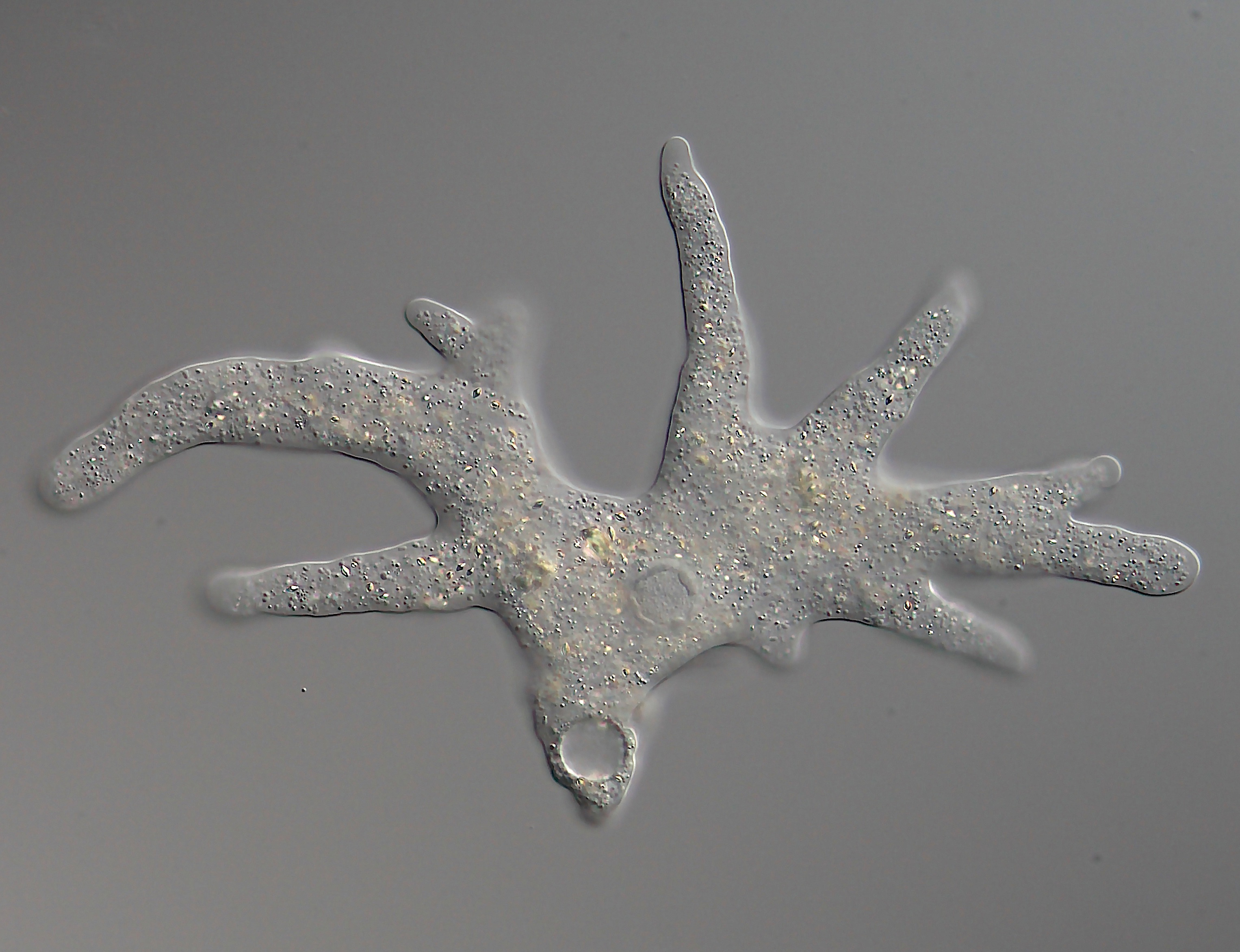

Scientific classification
- Domain: Eukaryota
- Supergroup: Amorphea
- Phylum: Amoebozoa
- Class: Tubulinea
- Order: Euamoebida
- Family: Amoebidae
- Genus: Amoeba
- Species: A. proteus

Binomial name
- Amoeba proteus (Pallas, 1766) Leidy, 1878

Synonyms
- Volvox proteus Pallas, 1766; Proteus diffluens O.F. Müller, 1786; Chaos diffluens (O.F. Müller, 1786) Schaeffer, 1926

= Amoeba proteus =

Species of amoeba

Amoeba proteus is a large species of amoeba closely related to another genus of giant amoebae, Chaos. As such, the species is sometimes given the alternative scientific name Chaos diffluens.

This protozoan uses extensions called pseudopodia to move and to eat smaller unicellular organisms. Food is enveloped inside the cell's cytoplasm in a food vacuole, where ingested matter is slowly broken down by enzymes. A. proteus inhabits freshwater environments and feeds on protozoans, algae, rotifers, and even other smaller amoebae. They are colorless, but they may have colored inclusions derived from their food.

A. proteus possesses a thick-walled nucleus containing granular chromatin, and is therefore a eukaryote. Its membrane consists of a phospholipid bilayer similar to other eukaryotic organisms.

== History ==
The first description of this amoeba is probably that of August Johann Rösel von Rosenhof who, in 1755, published drawings of an amoeboid protozoan he called the "little Proteus". Subsequently, various authors assigned Rösel's organism and other amoeboid protozoa various names: Carl Linnaeus termed Rösel's organism Chaos protheus in 1758. Otto Friedrich Müller referred to it as Proteus diffluens in 1786. In 1878, Joseph Leidy proposed the current name Amoeba proteus to describe Rösel's Proteus, Proteus diffluens, and another described amoeba Amoeba princeps.

== Locomotion patterns ==
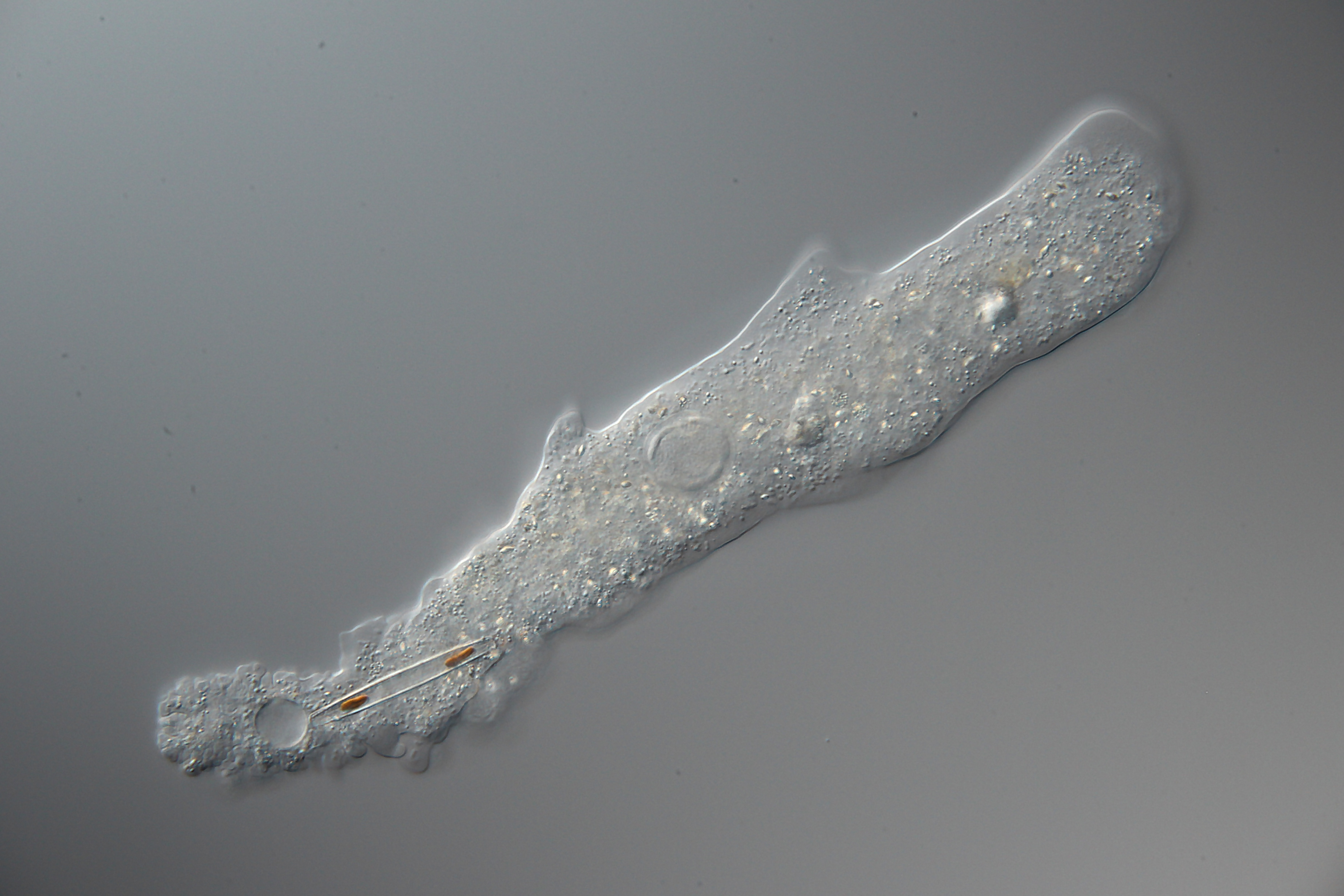
Amoeba proteus in locomotion

The locomotion of Amoeba proteus exhibits chaotic dynamics described by a low-dimensional chaotic attractor with a correlation dimension around 3-4, indicating that the seemingly random movement arises from deterministic cooperative interactions among a small number of processes like sol-gel transformations, cytoplasmic streaming, and calcium-mediated reactions. The Arp2/3 complex plays a crucial role in regulating actin polymerization and organization, localizing in the cortical actin network, discrete adhesion foci, and the perinuclear region. However, actin polymerization at the leading edge of migrating pseudopodia occurs independently of the Arp2/3 complex. During migration, changes in the ratio of filamentous actin (F-actin) to total actin correlate with the contractile state of the cell cortex, where an increasing F-actin/total actin ratio corresponds to isometric contraction, while a decreasing ratio indicates isotonic contraction associated with cytoskeleton disintegration. Furthermore, the Rac/PAK pathway is involved in regulating cell migration, with the PAK kinase MIHCK acting as an effector for the Rac-like protein, and inhibition of MIHCK disrupts normal migration and pseudopod formation, although it does not directly affect actin polymerization.

== Reproduction ==
Although Amoeba proteus has most of the key proteins associated with sexual processes (as do other amoebae), no evidence of meiosis or sexual activity has been reported.

== Video gallery ==
Amoeba proteus in motion

Amoeba engulfing a diatom

== See also ==
- Amoebiasis
- Chaos carolinense
