= Trichamoeba =

Scientific classification
- Domain: Eukaryota
- Clade: Amorphea
- Phylum: Amoebozoa
- Class: Tubulinea
- Order: Euamoebida
- Family: Amoebidae
- Genus: Trichamoeba; Fromentel, 1874

Genus of protozoans

Trichamoeba is a genus of Amoebozoa.

It includes the species Trichamoeba villosa.
