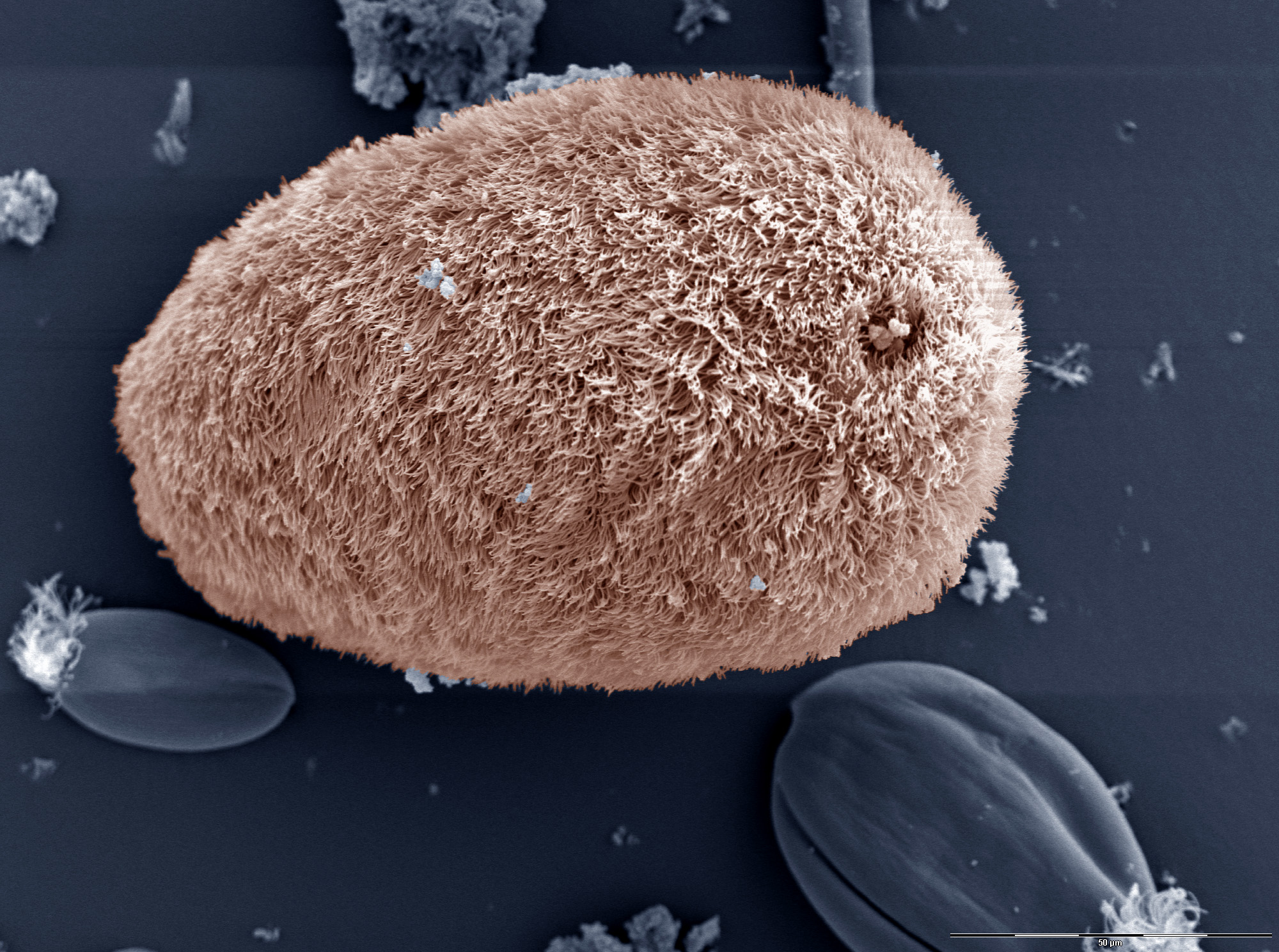
- Isotricha intestinalis

Scientific classification
- Domain: Eukaryota
- Clade: Sar
- Clade: Alveolata
- Phylum: Ciliophora
- Class: Litostomatea
- Order: Vestibuliferida
- Family: Isotrichidae; Bütschli 1889

Synonyms
- Dasytrichidae

= Isotrichidae =

Family of single-celled organisms

Isotrichidae is a family of single-celled organisms (protozoa) in the order Vestibuliferida. Most species in this family are endosymbionts of ruminant animals. They are holotrichous, that is, their surface is covered in cilia of uniform length, and they contain several contractile vacuoles.

This family contains four genera:

- Dasytricha, Schuberg 1888
- Isotricha, Stein 1859
- Oligoisotricha, Imai 1981
- Protoiostricha, Kopperi 1937
