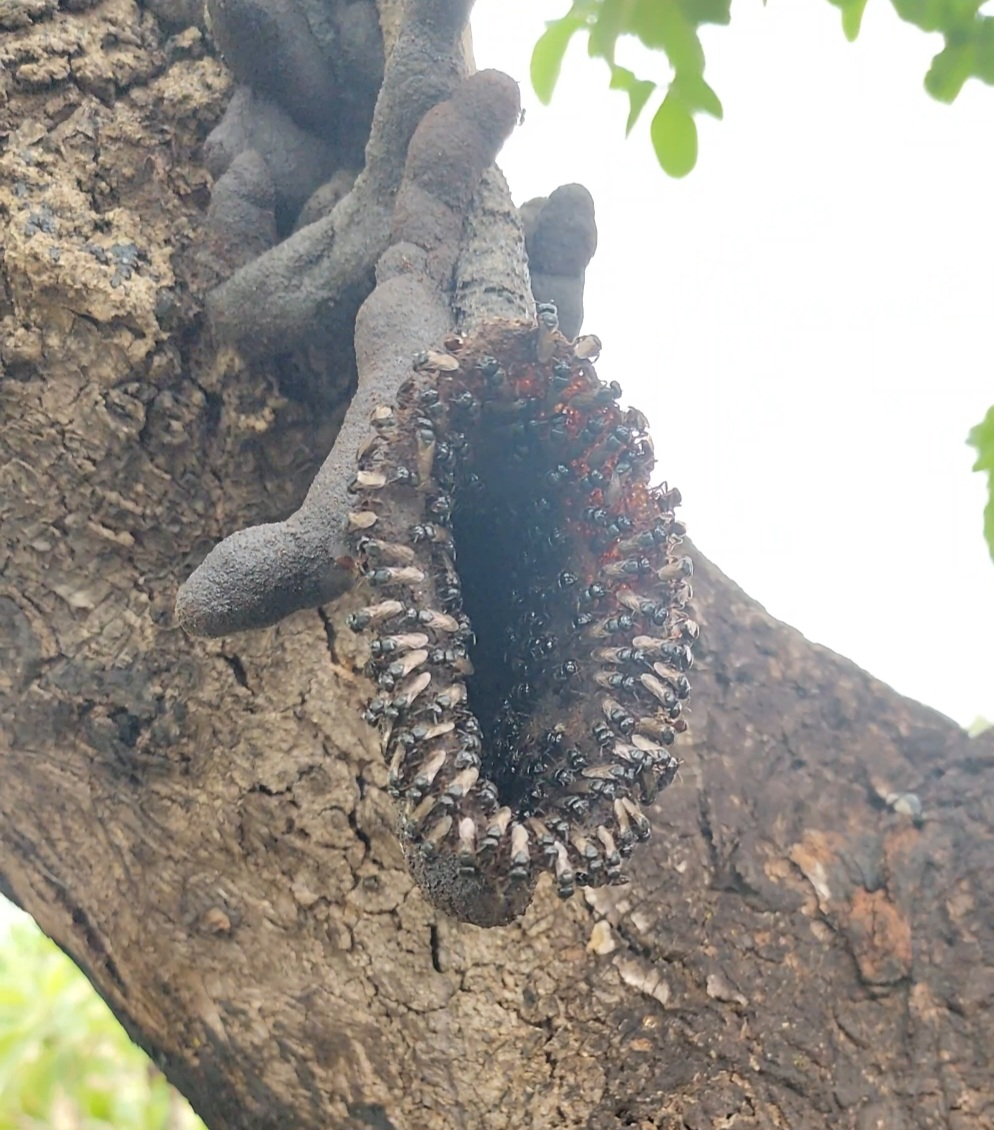

Scientific classification
- Kingdom: Animalia
- Phylum: Arthropoda
- Clade: Pancrustacea
- Class: Insecta
- Order: Hymenoptera
- Family: Apidae
- Genus: Lestrimelitta
- Species: L. limao

Binomial name
- Lestrimelitta limao Smith, 1863

= Lestrimelitta limao =

Species of bee

Lestrimelitta limao is a neotropical eusocial bee species found in Brazil and Panama and is part of the Apidae family. It is a species of stingless bees that practices obligate nest robbing. They have never been spotted foraging from flowers, an observation that supports their raiding behavior. Because of their lack of hind corbiculae, they must raid to obtain enough protein in their diet in the form of pollen and nectar. Lestrimelitta limao secrete a lemon-scented alarm allomone, from which they receive their name, in order to conduct successful raids. L. limao are hypothesized to produce poisonous honey that is toxic if consumed by humans. Because robber bees are so rare and difficult to observe, there is a limited scope of information available.

== Taxonomy and phylogeny ==
Lestrimelitta limao is part of the Apidae family, which consists of bumble bees, euglossines, honey bees, and stingless bees. This species is within the tribe Meliponini. L. limao usually visit the nests of the same family, most notably, Trigona.

== Description and identification ==
The Lestrimelitta limao species is divided into the workers, males and queens within each colony. Males are about the same size as workers, but the queens are noticeably larger. All members of the species are of shiny black coloration with hairs sparsely found on the body and densely found of the femora and tibiae. The hairs on the tibiae are short and yellow, while the sparse body hairs are black. The wings of L. limao contain barely noticeable cubital veins. Additionally they are identifiable by their lack of a functional worker corbiculae, elongated gut, fewer olfactory discs, and through their unique cleptobiotic behavior. A L. limao colony is generally composed of guards, workers, and scouts that all work towards raiding neighboring stingless bee colonies. There is no job specialization according to age.

=== Queens ===
The queen of Lestrimelitta limao will mate with multiple males. While there is one gravid queen, there are typically two or three virgin queens within a colony. The queen has longer and more robust legs than the workers or the males as well as a more developed malar space. While their wings are similar in shape and structure to workers, queen wings contain four to five hamuli. Gravid queens range from nine to 10.5 millimeters in length while virgin queens are approximately seven millimeters in length.

=== Workers ===
Each L. limao worker wing usually contains five or six hamuli. Workers range from 5.5 to 6.25 millimeters in length, about two millimeters in width, and five to 5.5 millimeters in forewing length.

=== Males ===
The males are slightly smaller than workers, having smaller heads, wider eyes, shorter malar space, and a narrower facial quadrangle. The flagellum of the male is made of 12 joints, and is actually longer than that of the cospecific worker. While the queen and workers have six visible tergites, males have seven. Males range from 5.5 to six millimeters in length, about two millimeters in width, and 4.5 to five millimeters in forewing length.

=== Nest architecture ===
Lestrimelitta limao nests are primarily built elevated off the ground. The surface of the nests remained a thin soft layer, but during repair, an involucrum forms in which old architecture is built over using new structures. Workers use building material acquired from raids of nearby stingless bee nests. Numerous blind sac elongate protuberances of 1-1.5 cm in height and diameter are built all over the surface. There is high variability in these protuberances due to a lack of integration of individual activities of the workers during nest repair.

Within the nest, there is usually large entrance tube that can extend up to 35 cm. This entrance tube contains stalactite-like protuberances on the underside of the nest. Researcher observed the constant smoothness and roundness of the interior of the flight tube. This main entrance is sealed using a waxy resin substance to prevent intruders from entering at night. Depending on the weather, guard bees will situate themselves in the inner margins of the nest entrance, or directly outside of it. The presence of an entrance tube is common in stingless bee nests and can be found in many species, such as tetragonisca angustula, to help protect the nest.

== Distribution and habitat ==
Lestrimelitta limao are found in Brazil and Panama and are considered a rare and dispersed species. Their nests can be found high up, in hollow tree trunks, but have occasionally been seen a foot off the ground or along the sides of walls. Lestrimellita limao colonies will strategically build their nests within 10 feet of other meliponine nests to make nest robbing more manageable.

== Raiding behavior ==
As obligate nest robbers, Lestrimelitta limao must visit neighboring nests to fulfill its nutritional needs. Usually, a host nest would be occupied for about 4 hours, but occasionally, a raid could last a maximum of 5 days. During the rainy season, there is a greater recurrence of raids due to the lower abundance of flowers. Mass raids involve up to 600 L. limao bees, while mild raids for nest material involve only a few. It is possible for multiple meliponine colonies may be raided simultaneously. On occasion, L. limao may evict or exterminate the original inhabitants of the host nest. Though instances have been recorded, raiders will rarely take permanent possession of the stores within the nest and the nest itself.

=== Scouting ===
Lestrimelitta limao scouts leave to gather information about potential victims at nearby meliponine nests. These workers have large cephalic gland reservoirs of citral and chemical isomers. These chemicals are liberated when they are killed at the host's nest entrance, recruiting the scout's nest mates. The release of these chemicals is what attracts more L. limao workers, initiating the raid.

=== Guarding ===
At their own nests, guards are not aggressive, but at the entrance of host nests, they form a circle in order to defend it from the hosts and from other insects. Lestrimelitta limao guards surround the outside of hosts nest, aligned side-by-side, before and during a raid. These guard ring robbers occasionally raise their abdomens, exposing their whitish intersegmental region and fan their wings. They release citral from their mandibular glands, an act that must be well timed relative to the progression and initiation of the raid.

=== Workers ===
Workers place small pieces of resin over the entrance holes to prevent ants and the hosts from entering the entrance tube during the raid. Once the raid is complete, they remove the seal.

== Human importance ==
=== Production ===
While bees of Lestrimelitta limao colonies have never been observed on flowers, they have been seen on poisonous plants. It is possible that the honey of L. limao causes illness and paralysis and has therefore been deemed toxic. In 1895, it was cited that the people of Alto Parana of Misoines use the same amount of honey produced by the “irati” (the culture’s name for L. limao) to treat the same paralysis that it causes. Similarly, in 1930 Nordenskioid cited the Guarayu Indians of Bolivia’s use of the honey to cure paralysis. The accounts of the effects of L. limao honey on different persons suggests that the honey may contain grayanotoxins and cause mad honey disease.
