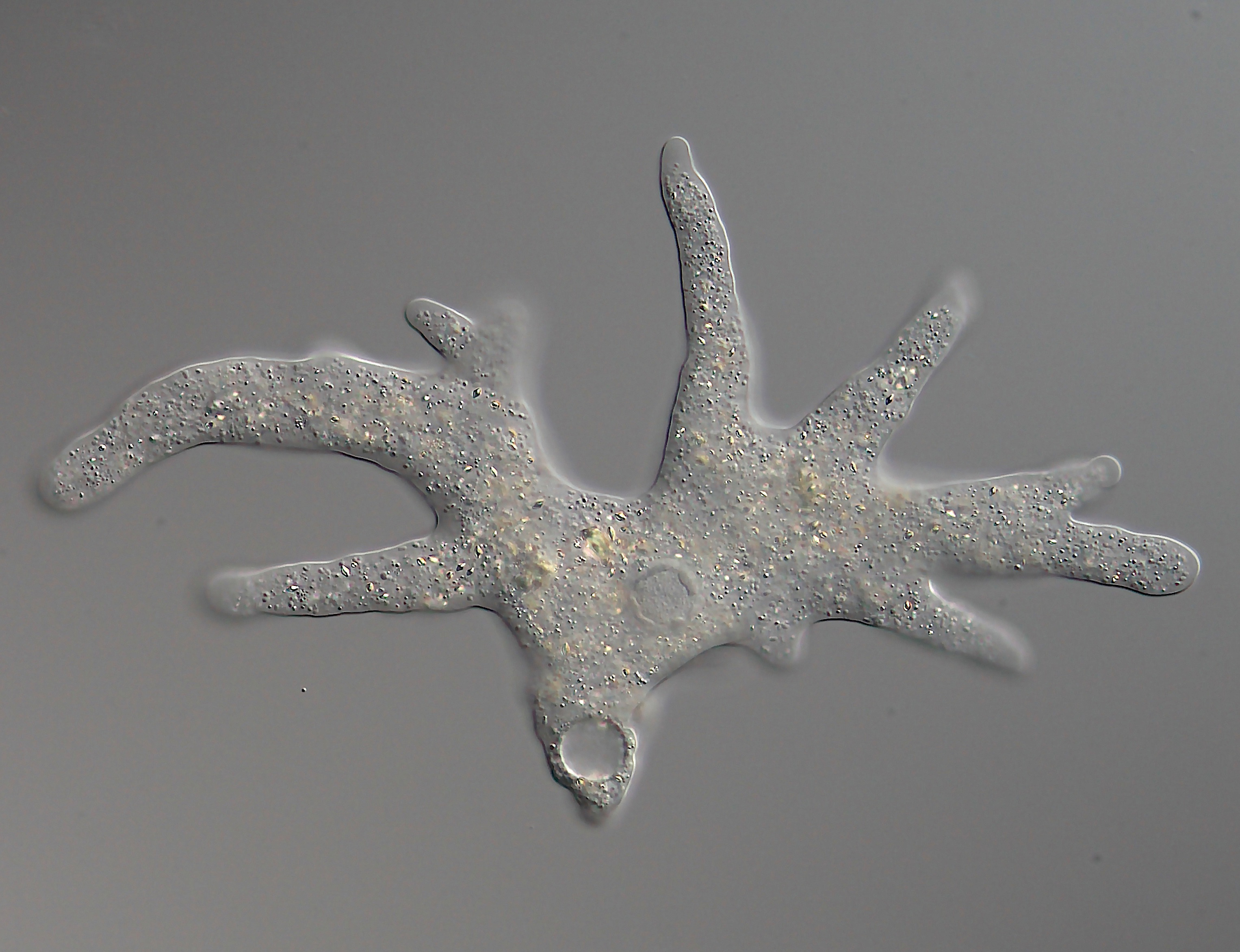
- Amoeba proteus

Scientific classification
- Domain: Eukaryota
- Phylum: Amoebozoa
- Class: Tubulinea
- Order: Euamoebida
- Family: Amoebidae; Ehrenberg 1838

Genera
- Amoeba; Chaos; Deuteramoeba; Hydramoeba; Metachaos; Parachaos; Stigmamoeba; Trichamoeba; †Triassamoeba

Synonyms
- Chaidae Poche 1913; Chaosidae Chatton 1953

= Amoebidae =

Family of protozoans

The Amoebidae are a family of Amoebozoa, including naked amoebae that produce multiple pseudopodia of indeterminate length. These are roughly cylindrical with granular endoplasm and no subpseudopodia, as found in other members of the class Tubulinea. During locomotion one pseudopod typically becomes dominant and the others are retracted as the body flows into it. In some cases the cell moves by "walking", with relatively permanent pseudopodia serving as limbs.

The most important genera are Amoeba and Chaos, which are set apart from the others by longitudinal ridges. The best known of the species in this family is Amoeba proteus, commonly used in classrooms to demonstrate movement by pseudopodia.
