= Henry Van Peters Wilson =

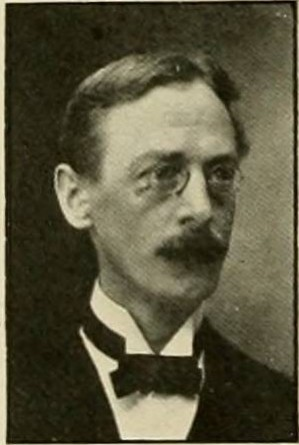
- Occupation: Biologist

Henry Van Peters Wilson (1863–1939) was a professor at University of North Carolina at Chapel Hill, Department of Biology. In 1907 he demonstrated that silicate sponges have the ability to re-form into functional creatures after the individual cells have been dissociated from one another by mechanical means (sieving through a fine silk mesh).
