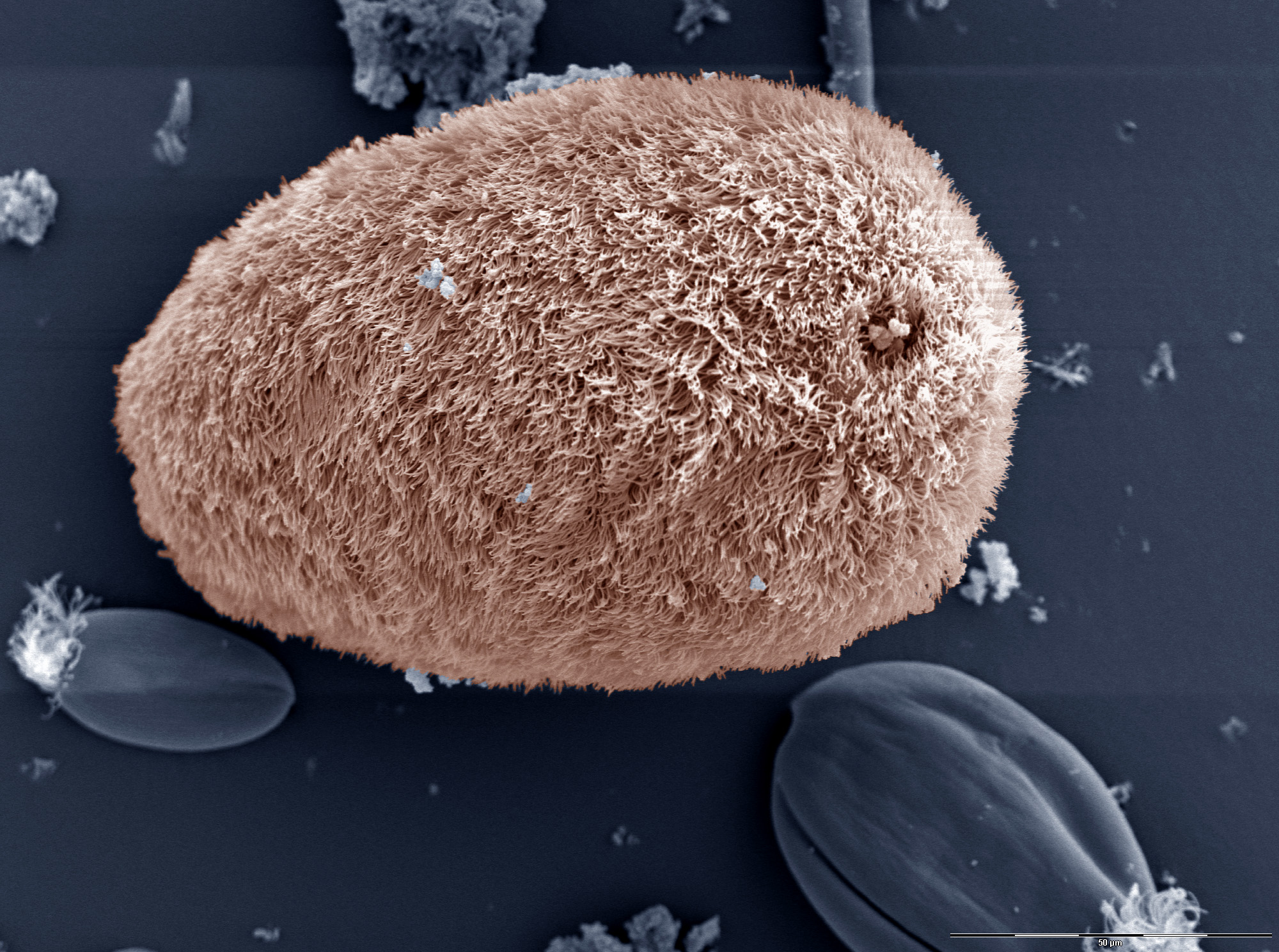
- Isotricha intestinalis

Scientific classification
- Domain: Eukaryota
- Clade: Sar
- Clade: Alveolata
- Phylum: Ciliophora
- Class: Litostomatea
- Order: Vestibuliferida
- Family: Isotrichidae
- Genus: Isotricha; Stein, 1859

= Isotricha =

Genus of single-celled organisms

Isotricha is a genus of protozoa (single-celled organisms) which are commensals of the rumen of ruminant animals. They are approximately 150 μm (0.0059 in) long.

Species include:

- Isotricha intestinalis Stein 1858
- Isotricha prostoma Stein 1858
