= August Johann Rösel von Rosenhof =

German painter, naturalist (1705–1759)

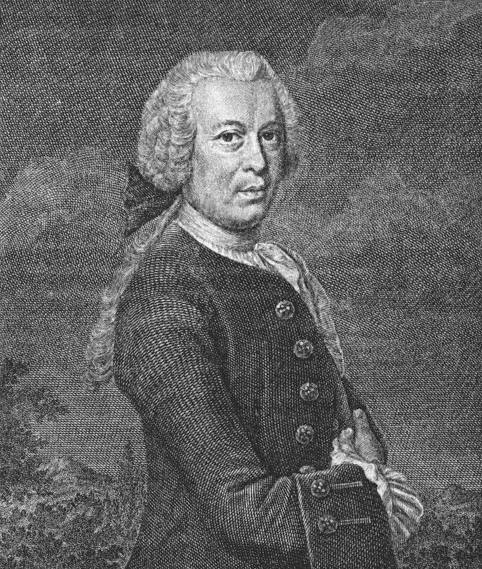
- Born: March 30, 1705; Augustenburg
- Died: 27 March 1759 (aged 53)
- Occupations: Naturalist; biological illustrator
- Known for: Contributions to entomology
- Spouse: Elisabeth Maria Rosa (m. 1737)
- Children: Katharina Barbara Rösel von Rosenhof

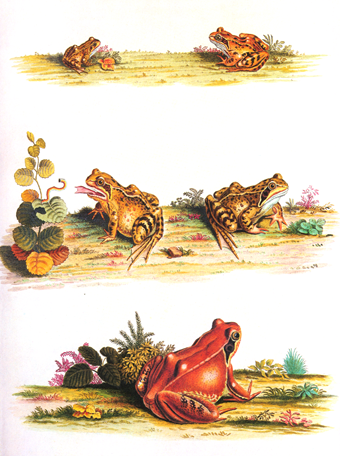
Plate of illustrations of frogs from Historia Naturalis Ranarum Nostratium

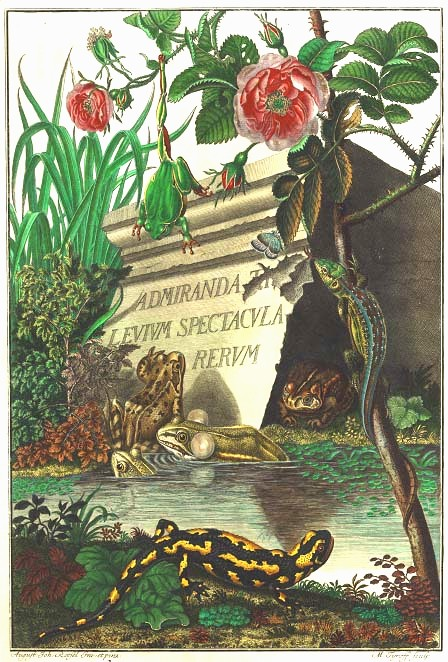
Rosenhof plate

August Johann Rösel von Rosenhof (March 30, 1705 in Augustenburg near Arnstadt – March 27, 1759 in Nuremberg) was a German miniature painter, naturalist and entomologist. With his accurate, heavily detailed images of insects he was recognised as an important figure in modern entomology.

== Life ==
Descendant of a "noble family of Austria", Rösel was born August Johannes Rösel. This was modified in 1753, undoubtedly in the honour of his uncle, the animal painter Wilhelm Rösel von Rosenhof. Rösel’s father died when he was very young and it was his uncle who gave him an artistic education after his godmother, the princess Augusta Dorothea von Arnstadt-Schwarzburg, had detected his talent. He continued studies of art at the Academy of Nuremberg (1724–1726) where he became a very gifted painter of portraits and miniatures, which enabled him to join the Danish court of Copenhagen in 1726. There he remained two years before returning to Germany, once more to Nuremberg.

Recovering from a disease, he discovered the work of Anna Maria Sibylla Merian, Metamorphosis insectorum Surinamensium (1647–1717) in which she described the insects and other animals which she observed in Surinam. Rösel conceived the idea to write and illustrate a similar book on the German fauna.

In 1737, he married Elisabeth Maria, the daughter of the surgeon, physiologist and poet Michael Bertram Rosa. In 1741 they had a daughter Katharina Barbara Rösel von Rosenhof, who would also become an artist.

His artistic talent gave him a very good reputation so that he lived comfortably while painting and he could use his spare time to observe insects, amphibians and reptiles in nature. He collected eggs and larvae in order to raise them at home and to study their development and their metamorphoses. His detailed observations, more useful by being accompanied by very beautiful illustrations, were published in two large books. The first, Insecten-Belustigung, appeared in 1740 and was devoted to the insects and other invertebrates like the sea anemones. His classification of the insects followed a natural system and he is regarded as one of the fathers of German entomology. The fourth part is practically a monograph of the spider Araneus diadematus. The description of the animal is illustrated by six plates which show the differences in variation of the colouring of the species. They show also internal dissections. Rosenhof was interested in the production of silk but he confused the anus with the opening of silk-producing glands.

He published, between 1753 and 1758, Historia naturalis Ranarum nostratium devoted to frogs. The quality of the work, in particular of its illustrations, make it one of the most beautiful devoted to these animals. He presented the life cycle of all the species of Germany, and their anatomy and their osteology. The second part of the work, appeared in 1758. It is prefaced by Albrecht von Haller (1708–1777).

He then started a similar work on the lizards and the salamanders but a cerebral attack paralysed him and he died a little later on March 27, 1759. Many descriptions of species made by Carl von Linné are based on the descriptions given by Rösel.

Roesel's bush-cricket Metrioptera roeseli was so named in his honour.

== Works ==
- Insecten-Belustigung (1740) online
- Historia naturalis Ranarum nostratium/Die natürliche Historie der Frösche hiesigen Landes(1758) online
- De natuurlyke historie der insecten online here continued by his daughter and her husband Christian Friedrich Carl Kleemann 1735-1789 and translated into Dutch by Adam Abrahamzoon Moerbeek

== Sources ==
- Kraig Adler (1989) Contributions to the History of Herpetology, S.S.A.R.
