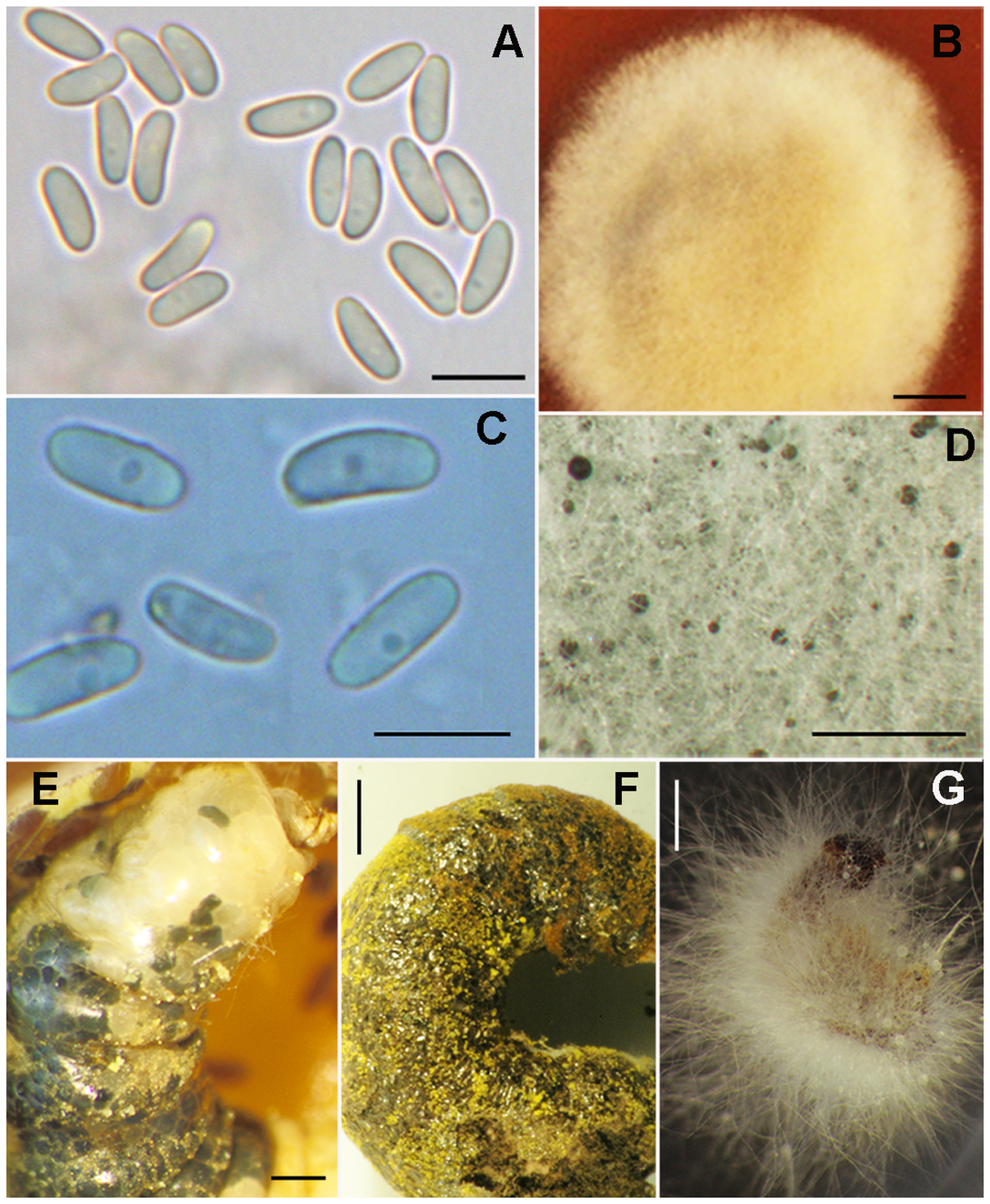

Scientific classification
- Kingdom: Fungi
- Division: Ascomycota
- Class: Eurotiomycetes
- Order: Onygenales
- Family: Ascosphaeraceae
- Genus: Ascosphaera
- Species: A. aggregata

Binomial name
- Ascosphaera aggregata Skou, JP (1975)

= Ascosphaera aggregata =

Species of fungus

Ascosphaera aggregata is a species of fungus.

== History and taxonomy ==
Ascosphaera aggregata, discovered in 1975 by Jens-Peder Skou is a fungus that is related to Ascosphaera apis.

== Habitat and ecology ==
Ascosphaera aggregata is an obligate parasite that causes chalkbrood in bees, symptom manifestations differ depending on age of the larva. It primarily infects alfalfa leafcutting bees, Megachile rotundata. Megachile rotundata infected with A. aggregata have been detected in the United States, Canada, and South America. Other bee species that A. aggregata has been seen to infect include the red mason bee (Osmia rufa), the patchwork leafcutter bee (Megachile centuncularis), Megachile pugnata and Megachile relativa.

== Growth, morphology and pathobiology ==
Ascosphaera aggregata is an obligate parasite that can cause chalkbrood by the fifth instar. The majority of the life cycle and growth of A. aggregata occurs in M. rotundata larvae. Infection of bee larvae occurs only via ingestion of resting spores, and is not possible via spore inhalation nor contact with the fungal vegetative form. Spores develop in the larva and cause it to swell, bursting the larval integument (giving the dead larvae a ragged appearance) and furthering the spread of the fungus. Buildup of larval cadavers traps the unaffected emerging bees, forcing them to chew through the cadavers and be covered in spores. Bees covered in spores then contaminate food provisions for other broods and spread the infection.

Early vegetative growth utilizes gut lumen nutrients. A. aggregata grows through the midgut wall to the hemocoele (event trigger is unknown, not because of lack of space nor food) eventually replacing larval tissue. Resulting larvae are filled with a mycelial mat comprising two layers: a dense inner layer and a less dense outer layer.

=== Sexual development ===
Ascospore morphology consists of two layers: an inner chitinous and smooth layer, and an outer layer that is rough, spotted, and not composed of chitin nor cellulose.;) Ascospore development in A. aggregata is unique and the resulting structure is referred to as a "spore cyst", or "ascocyst" or "synascus". Sexual development occurs on the outer mycelial mat in the subcuticular region, and is documented to proceed as follows:

1. The vegetative hyphae tips swell and form a thallus
2. The middle of the thallus grows and forms a nutriocyte (previously referred to as an archicarp)
3. The apical portion differentiates into the trichogyne cell.
4. Compatible trichogyne fuse and initiate plasmogamy.
5. Resulting dikaryotic fungal protoplasm then enters the nutriocyte and causes enlargement of the nutriocyte.
6. Nutriocyte growth causes the integument to rupture and initiate development of a fragile spherical structure without a cell wall.
7. Individual spores then pack together into a seemingly membrane-less spore ball.
8. Multiple spore balls then join and form a spore cyst.
9. Cell wall deposition changes spore colour from opaque white to grey to dull black

== Physiology ==
Ascosphaera aggregata has been found to be unable to break down chitin.

=== Diagnostic considerations ===
Although ascospore development is very unique, it is very hard to identify A. aggregata because the spore balls and conidia tend to resemble other species. Recent investigations by James and Skinner (2005) have discovered that PCR of the ITS domain of ribosomal DNA with species specific primer sets allows the detection of fungal DNA (working, even, in asymptomatic individuals). The PCR technique can also be used on hair and honey samples to avoid the difficulty of culturing spores, as spore were shown before to only germinate well in lipids. Storage of the fungus has also proven to be difficult as it collapses after 1–2 months during normal culture passaging. However, Jensen et al. (2009) found that spores could be preserved via cryopreservation or freeze-drying whereas hyphae unfortunately could not be preserved.

== Economic importance ==
Megachile rotundata is the primary pollinator of the commercially grown alfalfa seed, accounting for 46,000 metric tonnes of North American alfafa seed (two-thirds the global production) in 2004. M. rotundata is also the second most valuable field crop pollinator, behind the honey bee, because of the value of alfalfa in animal feed and hay. A. aggregata has been killing this economic pollinator in the US since 1972 and has been reported to be able to kill greater than 50% of a population.

Effective management of the fungus has yet to be discovered, as the current registered treatment in Canada (paraformaldehyde fumigation of spores) involves a carcinogen and other treatment options (heat and chloride treatments) are expensive and labour-intensive.
