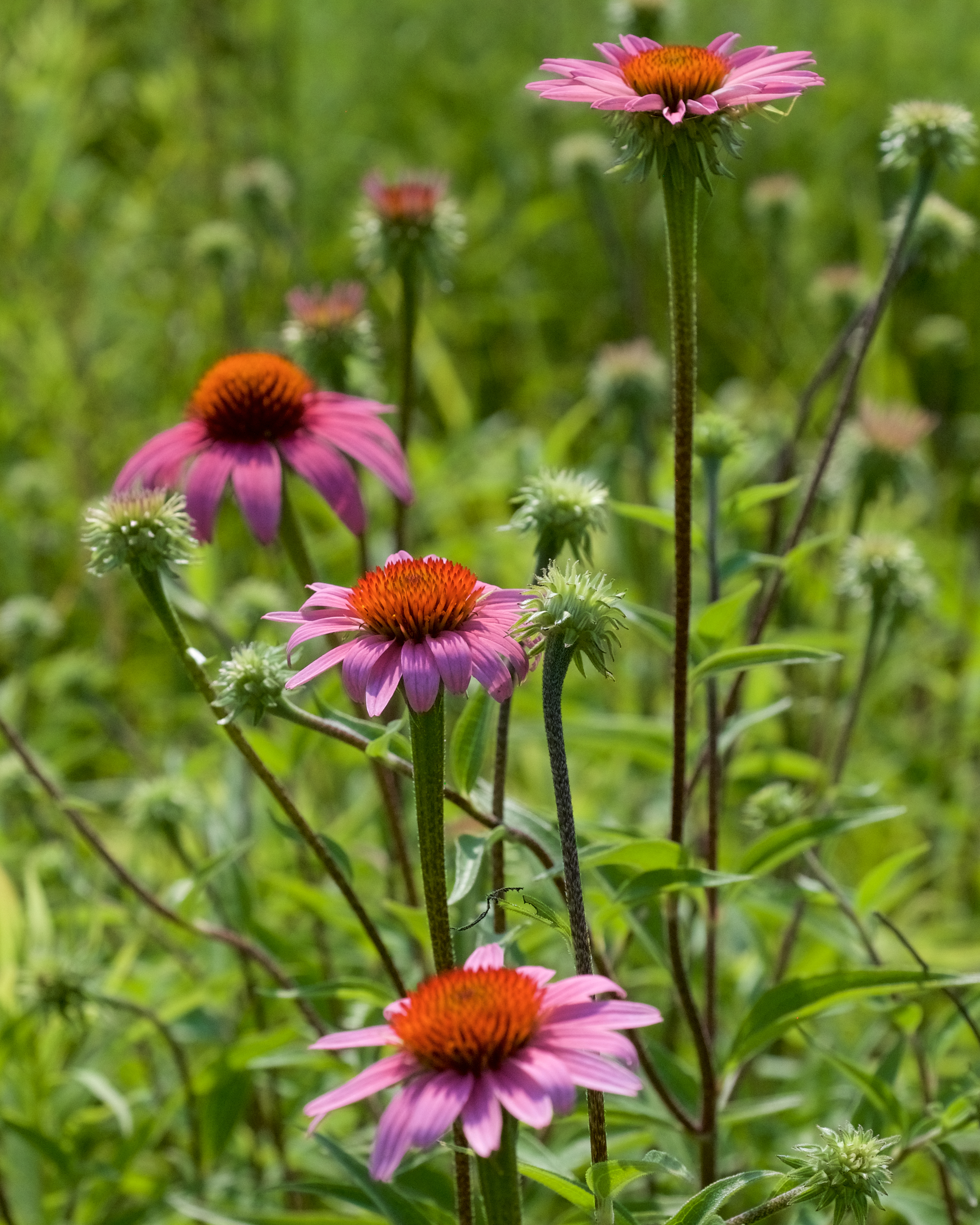
- At a prairie preserve in southwest Arkansas

Conservation status
- Apparently Secure (NatureServe)

Scientific classification
- Kingdom: Plantae
- Clade: Tracheophytes
- Clade: Angiosperms
- Clade: Eudicots
- Clade: Asterids
- Order: Asterales
- Family: Asteraceae
- Tribe: Heliantheae
- Genus: Echinacea
- Species: E. purpurea

Binomial name
- Echinacea purpurea (L.) Moench

Synonyms
- World Flora Online: Brauneria purpurea (L.) Britton; Echinacea intermedia Lindl. ex Paxton; Echinacea purpurea f. liggettii Steyerm.; Echinacea purpurea var. arkansana Steyerm.; Echinacea serotina (Nutt.) D.Don ex G.Don; Helichroa purpurea Raf.; Rudbeckia purpurea L.; Plants of the World Online: Brauneria purpurea (L.) Britton; Echinacea intermedia Lindl. ex Paxton; Echinacea purpurea f. ligettii Steyerm.; Echinacea purpurea var. arkansana Steyerm.; Echinacea purpurea var. serotina (Nutt.) L.H.Bailey; Echinacea serotina (Nutt.) D.Don ex G.Don; Helichroa alba Raf.; Helichroa amoena Raf.; Helichroa crocea Raf.; Helichroa elatior Raf.; Helichroa fusca Raf.; Helichroa fuscata Raf.; Helichroa linnaeana Raf.; Helichroa purpurea (L.) Raf.; Helichroa uniflora Raf.; Lepachys purpurea (L.) Raf.; Rudbeckia aspera Pers.; Rudbeckia hispida Hoffmanns.; Rudbeckia purpurea L.; Rudbeckia purpurea var. serotina Nutt.; Rudbeckia serotina (Nutt.) Sweet

= Echinacea purpurea =

Species of flowering plant in the daisy family

Echinacea purpurea, the eastern purple coneflower, purple coneflower, hedgehog coneflower, or Echinacea, is a North American species of flowering plant in the family Asteraceae. It is native to parts of eastern North America and present to some extent in the wild in much of the eastern, southeastern and midwestern United States, as well as in the Canadian Province of Ontario. It is most common in the Ozarks, the Mississippi Valley, and the Ohio Valley. Its habitats include dry open woods, prairies, and barrens.

== Description ==
Echinacea purpurea is an herbaceous perennial up to 120 centimeters (47 inches) tall by 25 cm (10 in) wide at maturity. Depending on the climate, it blooms throughout summer into autumn. Its cone-shaped flowering heads are usually, but not always, purple in the wild. Its individual flowers (florets) within the flower head are hermaphroditic, having both male and female organs in each flower. It is pollinated by butterflies and bees. The alternate leaves, borne by a petiole from 0 to 17 cm (0 to 7 in), are oval to lanceolate, 5–30 cm (2–12 in) long by 5–12 cm (2–5 in) wide; the margin is tightened to toothed.

The inflorescence is a capitulum, 7 to 15 cm (3 to 6 in) in diameter, formed by a prominent domed central protuberance consisting of multiple small yellow florets. These are surrounded by a ring of pink or purple ligulate florets. The tubular florets are hermaphrodite while the ligular florets are sterile. The involucral bracts are linear to lanceolate. The plant prefers well-drained soils in full sun. The fruit is an achene, sought after by birds.

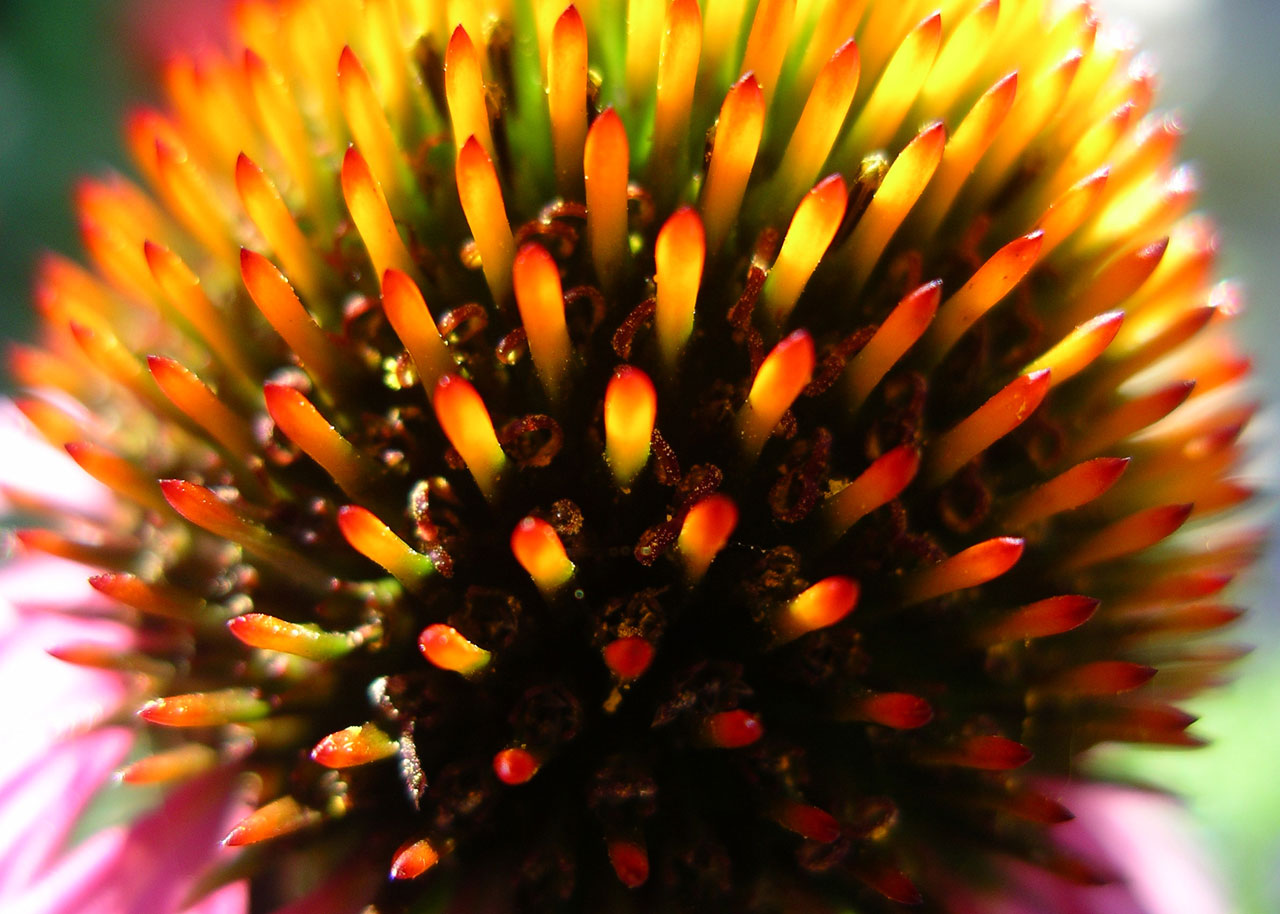
Close-up showing many individual flowers comprise the flowerhead

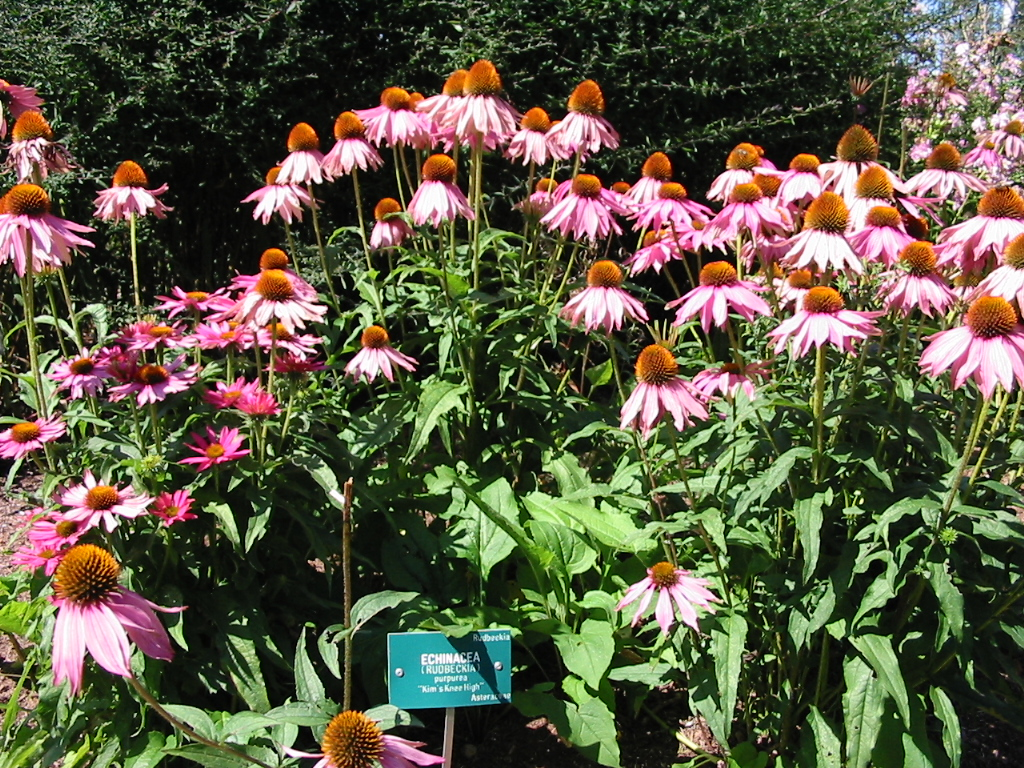
In cultivation

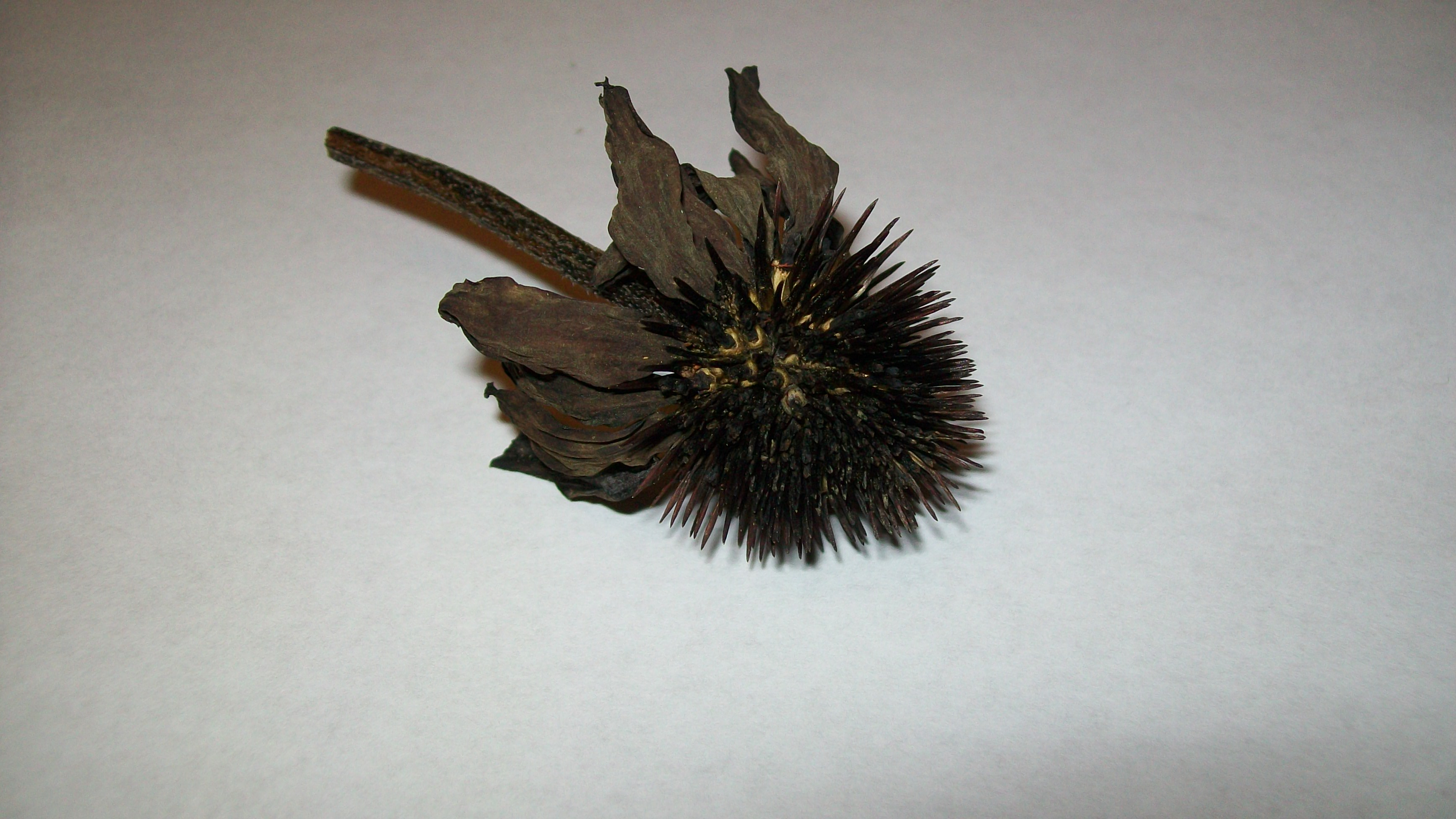
Dried spines

== Taxonomy ==
Echinacea is derived from Greek, meaning 'spiny one', in reference to the spiny sea urchins 'εχίνοι' which the ripe flower heads of species of this genus resemble. The epithet purpurea means 'reddish-purple'.

The species was named Rudbeckia purpurea by Carl Linnaeus in 1753. Linnaeus took the placement in the genus Rudbeckia from Jan Frederik Gronovius. He and Linnaeus based the name on a description under the name "Chrysanthemum americanum" given by Leonard Plukenet, published in 1696. In 1794, Conrad Moench placed it in genus Echinacea as Echinacea purpurea.

In 1818, Thomas Nuttall described what he thought to be a variety and named it Rudbeckia purpurea var. serotina. In 1823, Robert Sweet raised this variety to the rank of species as Rudbeckia serotina. In 1832, George Don moved it to the genus Echinacea as Echinacea serotina. In 2001, Shannon Binns et al. discovered a misapplication of the name Echinacea purpurea (L.) Moench for the taxon correctly named Echinacea serotina (Nutt.) G.Don in 1832. The authors proposed to conserve the name with a conserved type so as not to change a long standing name which would have caused confusion among gardeners and herbalists.

== Distribution and habitat ==
Echinacea purpurea is native to parts of eastern North America and present to some extent in the wild in much of the eastern, southeastern and midwestern United States as well as in the Canadian Province of Ontario. It is most common in the Ozarks, the Mississippi Valley, and the Ohio Valley. Its habitats include dry open woods, prairies, and barrens.

== Cultivation ==
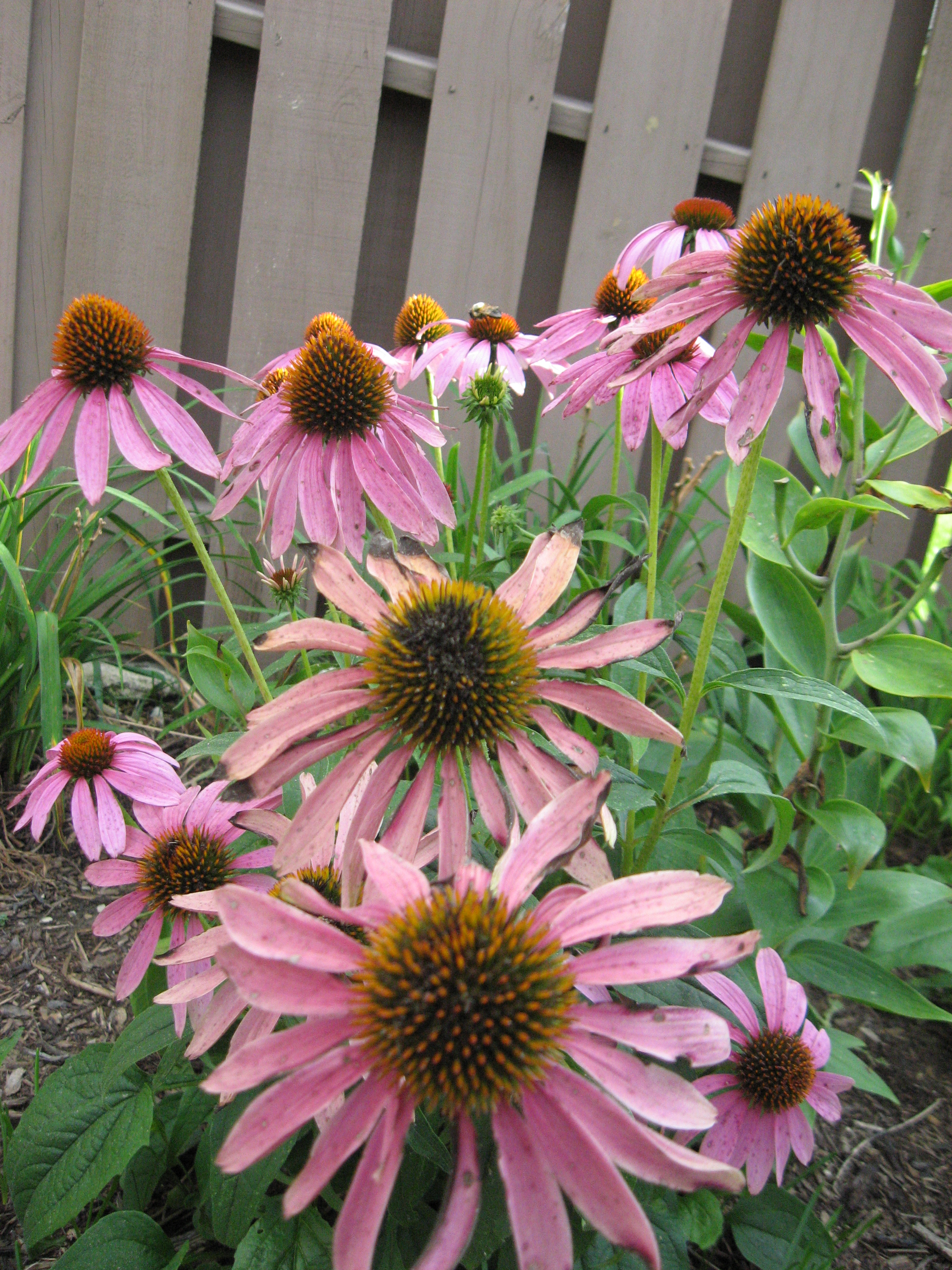
Plants raised outdoors

Echinacea purpurea is grown as an ornamental plant in temperate regions. It is ideal for curbs, walkways, or beds. The flowers can also go into the composition of fresh bouquets. Numerous cultivars have been developed for flower quality and plant form. The plant grows in sun or light shade. It thrives in either dry or moist soil and can tolerate drought once established. The cultivars 'Ruby Giant' and 'Elbrook' have gained the Royal Horticultural Society's Award of Garden Merit.

=== Propagation ===
Echinacea purpurea is propagated either vegetatively or from seeds. Useful vegetative techniques include division, root cuttings, and basal cuttings. Clumps can be divided, or broken into smaller bunches, which is normally done in the spring or autumn. Cuttings made from roots that are "pencil-sized" will develop into plants when started in late autumn or early winter. Cuttings of basal shoots in the spring may be rooted when treated with rooting hormones, such as IBA at 1000 ppm.

Seed germination occurs best with daily temperature fluctuations or after stratification, which help to end dormancy. Seeds may be started indoors in advance of the growing season or outdoors after the growing season has started.

== Ecology ==
Many pollinators are attracted to E. purpurea. Bees that are attracted to the flowers include bumblebees, sweat bees, honey bees, the sunflower leafcutter bee, and the mining bee Andrena helianthiformis. Butterflies that visit include monarchs, swallowtail butterflies, and sulphur butterflies. Birds, particularly finches, eat the seeds and disperse them through their droppings.

Slugs and rabbits will also eat the foliage when young, or shortly after emerging in the spring. Additionally, roots can be damaged and eaten by gophers.

== Chemistry ==
Echinacea purpurea contains alkamides, caffeic acid derivatives, polysaccharides, and glycoproteins. Nicotiflorin is the dominant flavonoid in E. purpurea, followed by the flavonoid rutin.

== Traditional medicine ==
Native Americans have used the plant as traditional medicine to treat many ailments.
