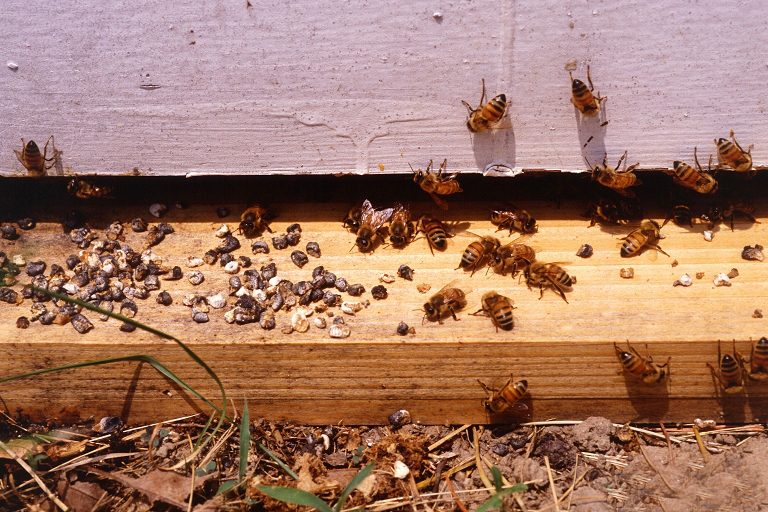

Scientific classification
- Kingdom: Fungi
- Division: Ascomycota
- Class: Eurotiomycetes
- Order: Onygenales
- Family: Ascosphaeraceae
- Genus: Ascosphaera
- Species: A. apis

Binomial name
- Ascosphaera apis (Maasen ex Claussen) L.S.Olive & Spiltoir, 1955

= Ascosphaera apis =

Species of fungus

Ascosphaera apis is a species of fungus belonging to the family Ascosphaeraceae. It was one of the first entomopathogen genomes to be sequenced. It has a cosmopolitan distribution.

It causes the chalkbrood diseases in bees, which rarely kills infected colonies but can weaken them and lead to reduced honey yields and susceptibility to other pests and diseases.
