= Sporocyst =

Sporocyst can refer to:

- A structure in Ascosphaera fungi
- A lifecycle stage in two unrelated groups of species:
  - Apicomplexa parasites: see Apicomplexa lifecycle stages
  - Trematode flatworms: see Trematode lifecycle stages
