= Megachile bruchi =

Scientific classification
- Domain: Eukaryota
- Kingdom: Animalia
- Phylum: Arthropoda
- Class: Insecta
- Order: Hymenoptera
- Family: Megachilidae
- Genus: Megachile
- Species: M. bruchi

Binomial name
- Megachile bruchi Schrottky, 1909

Species of leafcutter bee (Megachile)

Megachile bruchi is a species of bee in the family Megachilidae, making it a cousin of the alfalfa leafcutter bee (Megachile rotundata). It was described by Schrottky in 1909.
