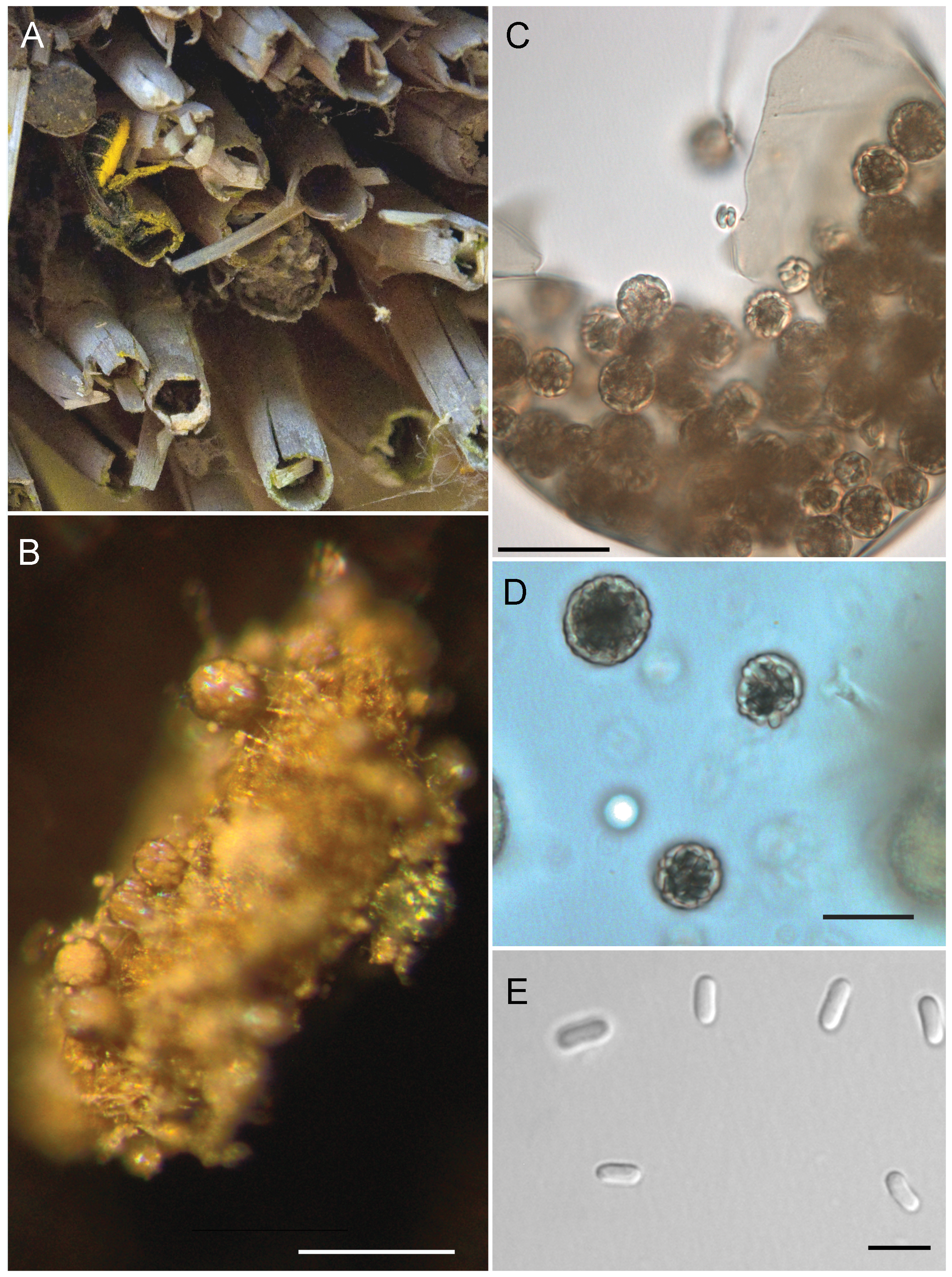
- A) habitat. Phragmites reeds and female Chelostoma florisomne returning with pollen for her brood. B) fecal pellet of C. florisomne larva covered with spore cysts; pale spore balls are visible through the transparent spore cyst wall. C) close-up of spore cyst showing spore balls and smooth, unornamented spore cyst wall. D) spore balls. E) bacilliform ascospores. Scale bars: B = 200 µm, C = 50 µm, C = 10 µm, D = 15 µm, E = 10 µm.

Scientific classification
- Kingdom: Fungi
- Division: Ascomycota
- Class: Eurotiomycetes
- Order: Onygenales
- Family: Ascosphaeraceae
- Genus: Ascosphaera; L.S.Olive & Spiltoir (1955)

Type species
- Ascosphaera apis (Maasen ex Claussen) L.S.Olive & Spiltoir (1955)

Synonyms
- Pericystis Betts (1912)

= Ascosphaera =

Genus of fungi

Ascosphaera is a genus of fungi in the family Ascosphaeraceae. It was described in 1955 by mycologists Charles F. Spiltoir and Lindsay S. Olive. Members of the genus are insect pathogens. The type species, A. apis, causes chalkbrood disease in honey bees. The reproductive ascospores of the fungus are produced within a unique structure, the spore cyst, or sporocyst.

== Species ==
- A. acerosa
- A. aggregata
- A. apis
- A. asterophora
- A. atra
- A. callicarpa
- A. celerrima
- A. cinnamomea
- A. duoformis
- A. fimicola
- A. flava
- A. fusiformis
- A. larvis
- A. major
- A. naganensis
- A. osmophila
- A. parasitica
- A. pollenicola
- A. proliperda
- A. scaccaria
- A. solina
- A. subcuticularis
- A. tenax
- A. torchioi
- A. variegata
- A. verrucosa
- A. xerophila
