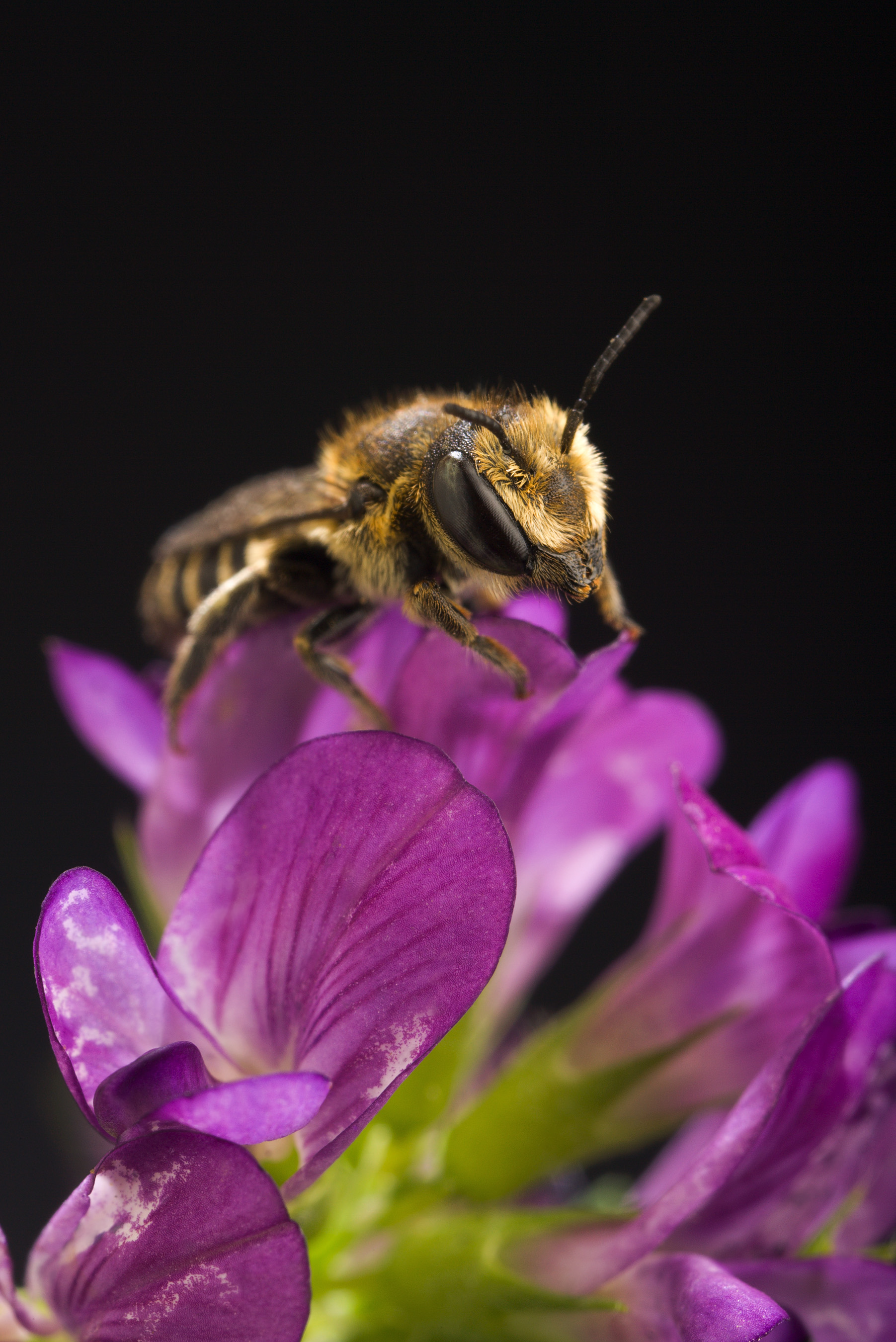

Scientific classification
- Kingdom: Animalia
- Phylum: Arthropoda
- Clade: Pancrustacea
- Class: Insecta
- Order: Hymenoptera
- Family: Megachilidae
- Genus: Megachile
- Subgenus: Eutricharaea
- Species: M. rotundata

Binomial name
- Megachile rotundata (Fabricius, 1787)

= Megachile rotundata =

Species of bee

Megachile rotundata, the alfalfa leafcutting bee, is a European bee that has been introduced to various regions around the world. As a solitary bee species, it does not build colonies or store honey, but is a very efficient pollinator of alfalfa, carrots, other vegetables, and some fruits. Because of this, farmers often use M. rotundata as a pollination aid by distributing M. rotundata prepupae around their crops. Each female constructs and provisions her own nest, which is built in old trees or log tunnels. Being a leafcutter bee, these nests are lined with cut leaves. These bees feed on pollen and nectar and display sexual dimorphism. This species has been known to bite and sting, but it poses no overall danger unless it is threatened or harmed, and its sting has been described as half as painful as a honey bee's.

== Taxonomy and phylogeny ==
Megachile rotundata is a member of the subfamily Megachilinae, which includes more than 4,000 bee species; this currently makes this family the second-largest among all bee families. This subfamily is one of four other subfamilies of Megachilidae, the other three being the Fideliinae, Pararhophitinae, and Lithurginae. Phylogenetic studies suggest that this subfamily is monophyletic. More specifically, it belongs to the genus Megachile, which contains 52 subgenera and 1,478 species. The genus Megachile consists of bees that cut leaf pieces to line their nests.

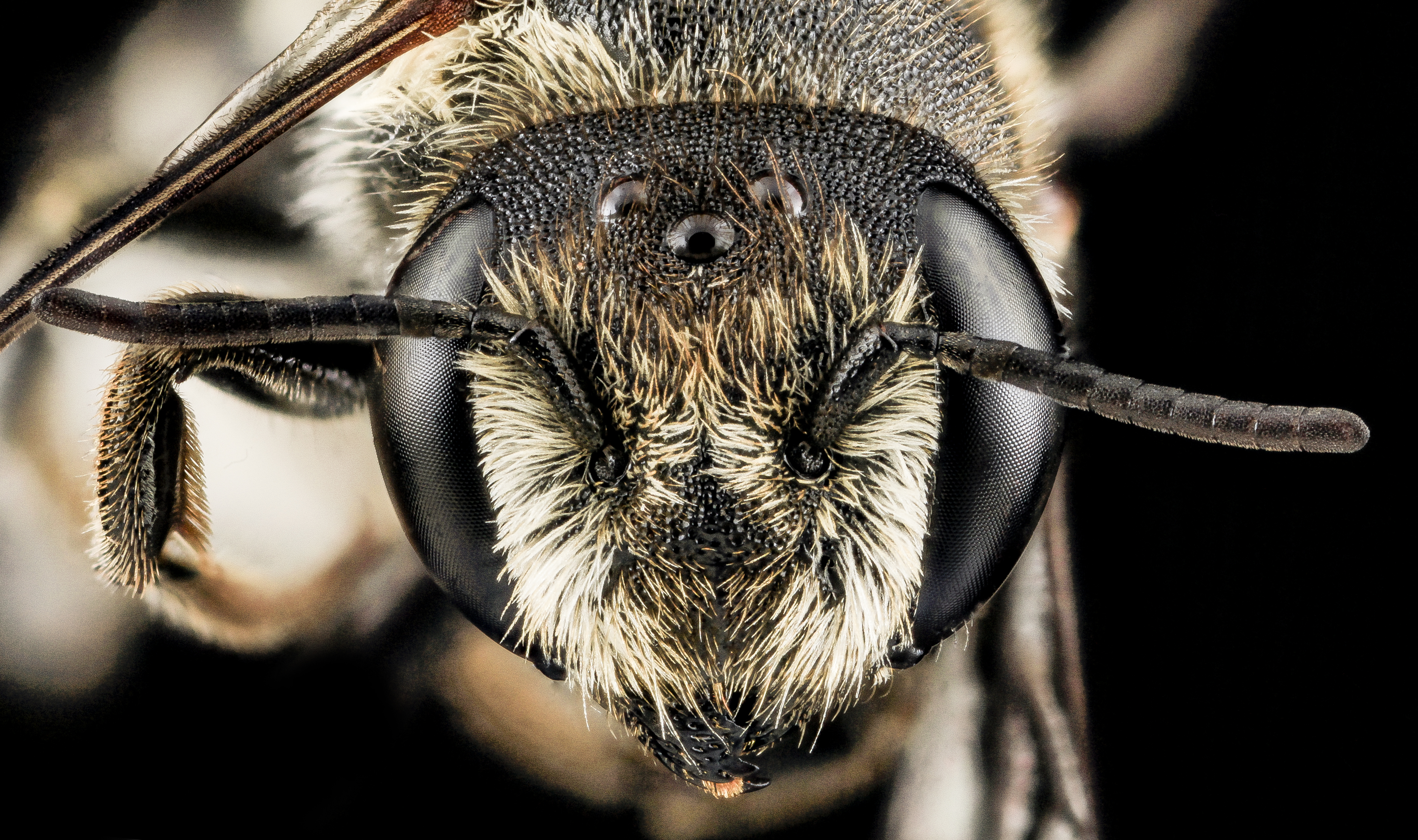
Heads-on view of female

== Description and identification ==
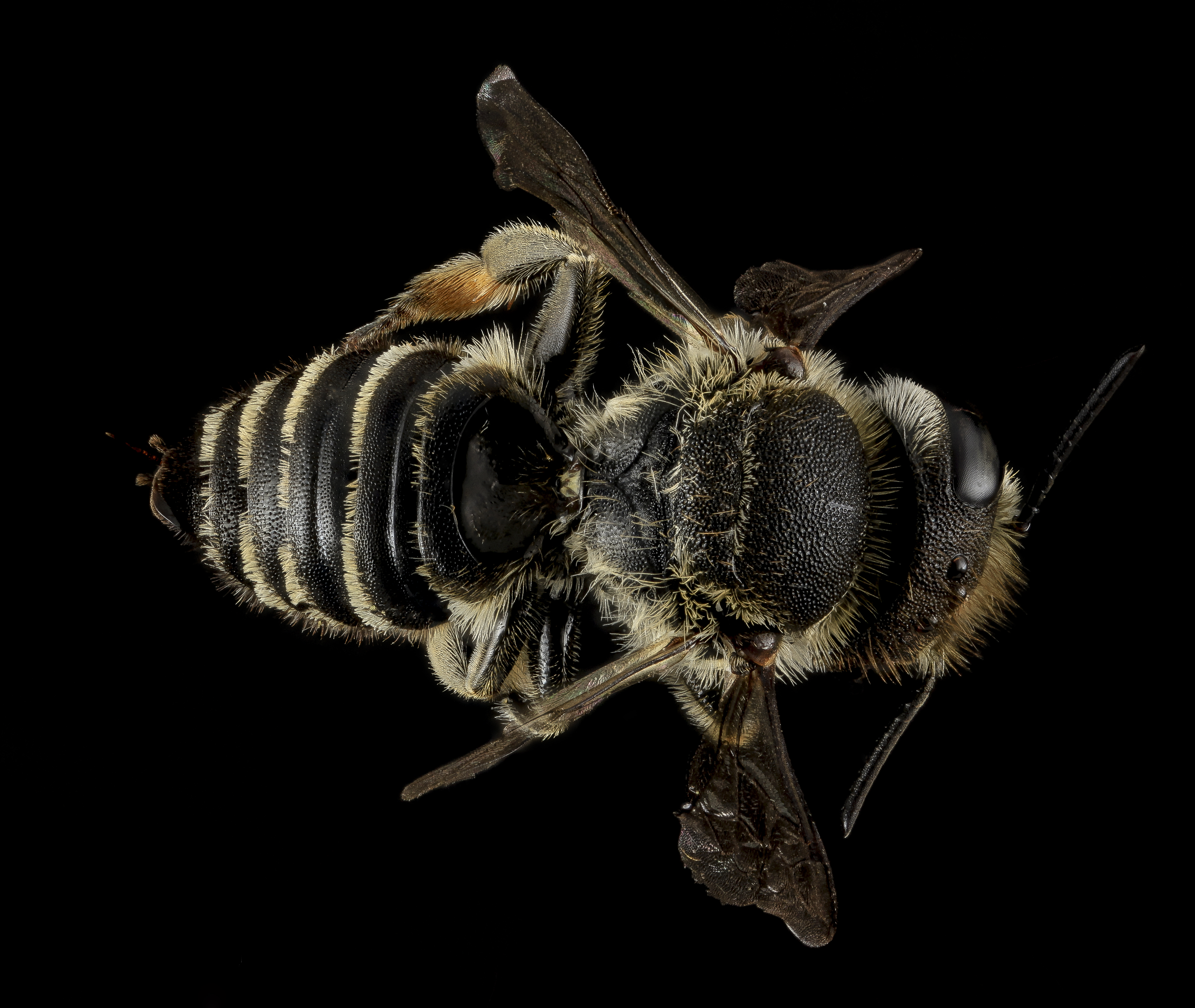
Backside of female, showing such features as the thorax, abdomen, wings, and color of the body hairs

Megachile rotundata is a European leaf-cutting bee placed in the subgenus Eutricharaea, the "small leaf-cutting bees"; they are 6–9 mm (0.24–0.35 in) in length. They are partially bivoltine, meaning that under the right conditions they can produce two generations per year. These bees present a sexual dimorphism, in which the males are smaller than the females and differently marked. Megachile rotundata bees are a dark grey color. Females have white hairs all over their bodies, including on their scopae. In contrast, males have white and yellow spots on their abdomens.

== Distribution and habitat ==
Megachile rotundata is currently found on all continents except Antarctica. In North America, the species was deliberately imported to assist in the pollination of food crops, but has now become feral and widespread. M. rotundata was also introduced to New Zealand in 1971 and Australia in 1987 to assist in the pollination of alfalfa (known locally as lucerne).

=== Nest construction ===
Females construct tubular nests in a variety of sites, including rotting wood, flower stems, reeds, and soda straws. In the wild, females also create nests in small holes in the ground or in available cracks/crevices in trees or buildings. The nests are composed of a string of individual cells, as many as the space will allow. When managed for pollination, the females are induced to nest in paper cylinders similar to drinking straws or drilled blocks of wood.

Each cell is made from circular disks cut from plant leaves using the bee's mandibles, hence the name "leafcutter". Females use about 15 leaves per cell, called a concave bottom, overlapping the leaves to produce the thimble-shaped cell. While the bees do not store honey, females do collect pollen and nectar which they store in the cells of their nests. Specifically, females first regurgitate the nectar they have provisioned into the cell and then transfer the pollen that is attached to their scopa on top of the nectar. Each cell contains one pollen and nectar ball, and one egg with each cell containing a 2:1 nectar-to-pollen ratio. The completion of one cell in the nest requires between 15 and 20 provisioning trips. After the female lays her eggs, she seals the cell with circular leaf pieces.

=== Nest dimensions and sex ratio ===
Studies reveal that positioning of male and female progeny in the nest is strategic and that cell size plays a major role in the size of progeny, independent of the mother's size. Females have been observed to lay female eggs in the inner cells and male eggs in the outer cells. With respect to sex ratios, larger cell provisions are correlated with a greater production of female offspring. Two explanations exist for these behaviors in terms of mother's foraging behaviors: 1) The mother brings more provisions to the inner cells because she expects that female progeny will be produced there and 2) the mother chooses to fertilize her egg, and therefore promotes the production of female progeny, because she has to bring larger provision proportions to a larger cell. The sex ratio changes depending on nest size, length, and nesting material. This ratio is controlled by the female. These observations have been made for females that make their nests in tunnels. For example, a 5.5 mm tunnel diameter is associated with a 3:1 ratio and a 6.0 mm tunnel diameter is associated with a 2:1 ratio of males to females. Shorter tunnels, those that are below 5.0 cm long, are less favorable.

=== Nest recognition ===
During nest construction, females transfer olfactory cues onto their nests to facilitate nest recognition. Specifically, they transfer these hormones by running their abdomens along the nest or excreting liquid from the tip of the abdomen. The olfactory cues are especially concentrated around the nest entrance. When these olfactory cues were experimentally removed, females of M. rotundata were unable to identify their own nests, revealing the importance of these chemicals. The chemical composition of these olfactory cues includes hydrocarbons, wax esters, fatty aldehydes, and fatty alcohol acetate esters.

== Life cycle ==
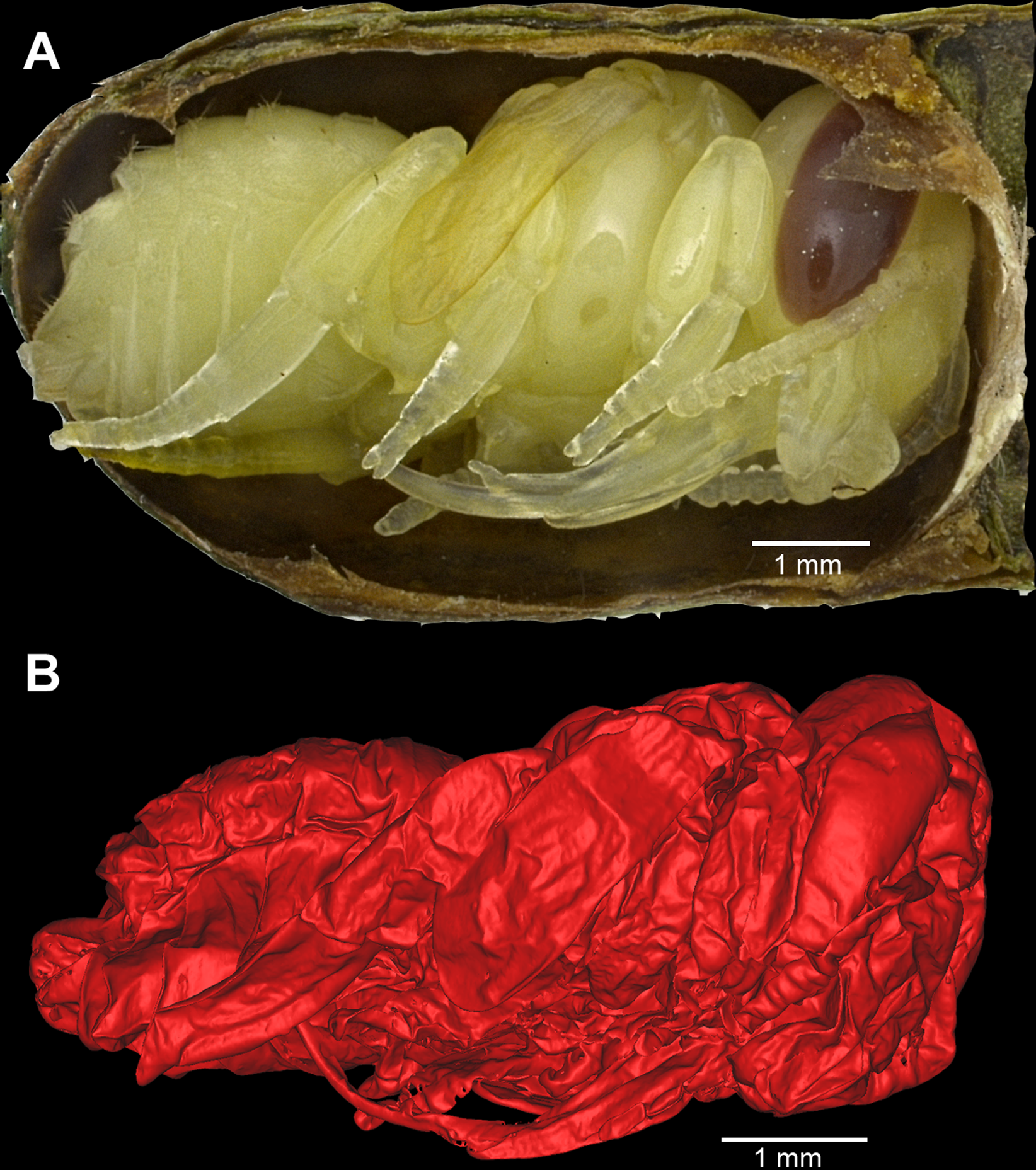
Pupae of (A) female M. rotundata and (B) subfossil male Megachile gentilis

As a member of the Hymenoptera order, the alfalfa leafcutter bee is haplodiploid. Adults emerge by the end of the summer through one of two developmental pathways: larvae will develop by the end of one summer and proceed through a prepupal diapause phase until the next summer; or larvae, known as "second-generation" bees, skip this phase and emerge as adults in the same summer.

The larva transitions through four instar stages before emerging as an adult. During its development, which occurs rapidly, the larva consumes the pollen ball and enters diapause when the pollen is fully consumed. In its progression into the diapause phase, the larva defecates pellets in a ring formation and then spins its cocoon out of silk threads. The next spring, the mature larva pupates, a process that lasts 3–4 weeks, and completes its development. Once the bee is developed, it cuts its way out from the nest by chewing itself out of its cocoon.

Upon emergence, females mate immediately and begin constructing their nests after a week.

Progeny released via the two alternative pathways for emergence display different sex ratios and sizes. Among adults that emerge during the summer of the same year, the sex ratio is biased towards males. Among the "second-generation bees", however, the sex ratio is female biased. Further, spring-emergent adults weigh more than summer-emergent ("second-generation") adults. These differences have been proposed to be attributed to the chances of survival to mating of the two sexes and the metabolic costs involved in development. Bees that undergo diapause and emerge in the spring must endure the long winter, so require more food stores. As a result, they will be larger when they mature. Another explanation has been that smaller bees mature faster, thus are able to mate more quickly when they emerge in the summer to avoid the cold, harsh conditions of the winter.

The sex ratio of the offspring also depends on the distance between nesting and foraging sites. Females have been observed and determined to bias their offspring sex ratio to males at larger flight distances from the nest.

=== Kin recognition and fratricide ===
Research on second-generation bees illustrates that kin recognition of nest mates is not a genetically based behavior. Further, fratricide has been hypothesized to be a nondiscriminatory behavior; emerging individuals treat developing siblings and non-siblings similarly. When developing in cells behind diapausing bees, inner-nesting bees either bypass the nest in front of them, retreat back to their nests until diapausing individuals emerge, or chew through the nesting cells in front of them, killing the diapausing bees. These decisions are contingent on the extent of development of delay of nestmates. For example, emerging individuals would remain in their cells when they were delayed from emerging for a relatively short period of time. When delayed for longer periods of times, however, emerging individuals would use their mandibles to destroy the cells of their nest mates. With respect to sex differences, males have been observed to bypass nests more frequently than females due to the small size of males.

== Sexual behavior ==
=== Mating ===
Megachile rotundata has been found to be a monandrous bee species. During the mating season, males attempt to obtain mates by positioning themselves at sites where females are likely to be, including foraging sites and nests. While females can mate several times, they resist male advances by restricting their mating to one sexual interaction and fleeing from these males. This behavior is attributed to female productivity during the construction of her nest and egg-laying. When harassed, females are unable to build their nests efficiently, making fewer foraging trips and spending a longer time overall in nest construction. Fleeing allows females to avoid being mounted. In the process of fleeing, however, females may lose their nesting materials, such as leaves and must then make an additional trip to make up for the lost materials.

=== Sexual pheromones ===
Sexual pheromones in epicuticular waxes are released by females to assist in attracting males as mates. Studies of the emissions from these waxes reveal that alkenes are the primary compound detected by males. Further, females of different ages emit different pheromones, containing different alkene compositions. In young females, substances that classify as either 7-pentacosene or 9-pentacosene are present in the highest concentrations and, in older females, 5-monoene compounds predominate. During mating season, males are able to detect these pheromones and preferentially select young females to copulate with.

== Interaction with other species ==
=== Diet ===
Megachile rotundata can feed on nectar and pollen from a variety of plants but prefer Medicago sativa. Females will immediately begin feeding after emergence during the maturation period of their eggs. During feeding, the bee will insert its proboscis into the keel of the plant. In the process, pollen is brushed onto its scopa.

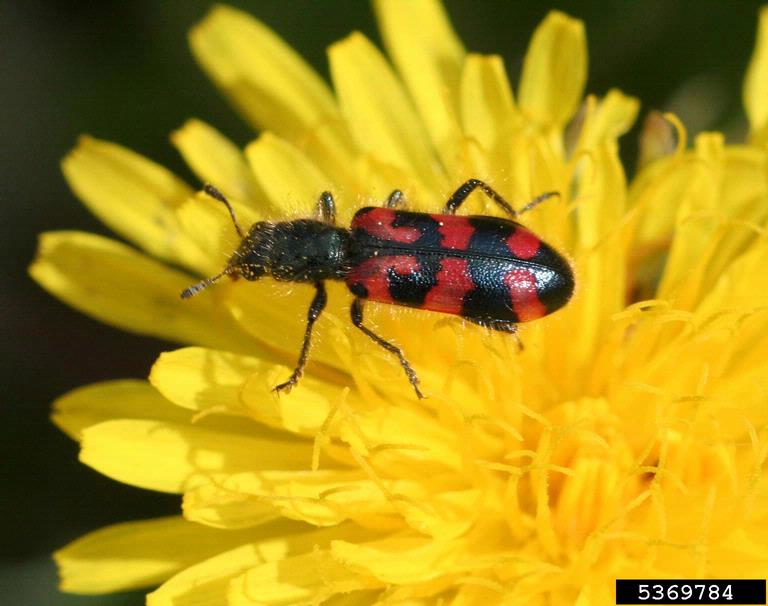
One predator of M. rotundata, Trichodes ornatus, on a yellow inflorescence

=== Predators ===
Currently, 28 species are known to prey on M. rotundata, all of which have unique ways of invading and destroying their host nests. Some species include Trogoderma glabrum, Trogoderma variabile, Tribolium audax, Tribolium brevicornis, and Trichodes ornatus. T. ornatus is the most formidable predator, with females laying their eggs in cracks between leaf pieces. During development, T. ornatus larvae kill host bee larvae and consume pollen from nest provisions. When it reaches the third stage of development, it burrows into adjacent cells and consumes host larvae irrespective of host larval instar stage. In another case, female T. glabrum females lay eggs in cracks between cells at the back of the nest. As they develop, the larvae begin to consume host larvae, moving towards the front of the nest and eating females first. In a third case, T. variabile attacks M. rotundata when it is in its cocoon or the pupal stage.

=== Parasites ===
Various families of wasps are the primary parasites of M. rotundata. Some species include Pteromalus venustus, Monodontomerus obscurus, Melittobia chalybii, Diachys confusus, and Sapyga pumila. The most formidable predator of this species is P. venustus, a parasitoid wasp in which the female uses her ovipositor to sting a developing M. rotundata larvae or pupae. After stinging to paralyze its host, the female lays her eggs on the host's surface and the development of the parasite offspring takes place. After about 15–20 weeks, adults of P. venustus emerge.

Other parasites include several species of Coelioxys and Nemognatha lutea. Coelioxys spp. take advantage of instances when females of M. rotundata are away from the nest, such as during foraging, to lay their egg in the host nest cells. Once a Coelioxys reaches the larval stage, it will kill the developing, host larva and consume all of the provisions that the host female placed in the nest. N. lutea, in contrast, initiate parasitism of hosts at foraging sites. Specifically, female N. lutea will lay their eggs on flowers and, when a bee arrives at this flower during provisioning, will secure itself, as a triungulin stage, to the bee. The triungulin will then, upon the host bee's arrival to its nest, remove itself from the bee, entering a cell and consuming all the provisions gathered by the host female.

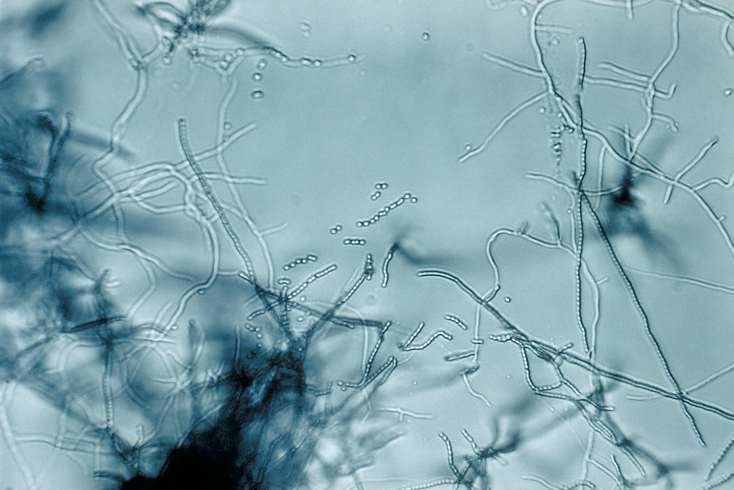
Slide illustrating Streptomyces culture

=== Mating ===
Males of the species may, presumably by mistake, attempt to mate with other bee species that are using the same foraging areas as female leaf cutters. They follow several inches behind their intended partner, whether a leaf cutter or bumble bee, which is moving around a plant seeking a flower; then when the target does alight, the male leaf cutter darts rapidly onto the target's back. This causes bumble bees and nonreceptive female leaf cutters to move to another flower and in the process shed the male leaf cutter. The male may then move right to the next prospect, or may first stop for a sip of nectar.

=== Disease ===
Chalkbrood disease in M. rotundata, specifically larvae, was discovered in 1974 in Nevada. This disease occurs from exposure of M. rotundata to Ascosphaera aggregata, which is introduced into the nest cells through nectar and pollen provisions that females bring back from foraging visits. Signs of chalkbrood infection have been observed to occur in the fifth-instar larvae, leading to the milky appearance of the larval hemolymph and development of a pink, tan, or gray cast in their head or abdominal regions. These changes are accompanied by the spread of pink, tan, or gray color throughout the body of the larvae, and dark-colored, fungal cysts appear under the cuticle.

A variety of microorganisms have been isolated from the alimentary canals and frass of M. rotundata. Bacteria include Bacillus firmus, B. licheniformis, B. megaterium, B. pumilus, and Streptomyces spp., and fungi include Trichosporonoides megachiliensis. With respect to the development of chalkbrood, the bacteria and fungi may promote the inhabitation of A. aggregata. This is supported by observations in chalkbrood-diseased larvae, which contain higher levels of bacteria and fungi in their guts than in healthy larvae.

In controlling chalkbrood, such methods as decontamination of nest cells and materials and shelters was initially achieved using household bleach. Current methods include paraformaldehyde fumigation.

=== Defense ===
Female alfalfa leafcutter bees have stingers, but both sexes usually use their mandibles as a defensive mechanism, usually only defending themselves when squeezed or antagonized. So, bee suits, such as those required with honey bees, are not necessary when dealing with these bees. When these bees do sting, however, they do not lose their stingers or die after stinging.

== Human importance ==
=== Human assistance in pest control ===
In managing M. rotundata for pollination, such methods as dichlorvos pest strips and ultraviolet lamps placed above liquid traps are effective in killing parasitoids, but not harming M. rotundata. Other methods of preventing parasitoid invasion include physical barriers. For example, the presence of thick artificial cavities separating the exterior from the nest and application of a felt cloth sealing to the back of the nesting board prevents parasitoid access to the nest. Another way that pests are controlled is by opening up the nesting material and cleaning the cocoons.

=== Pollination ===
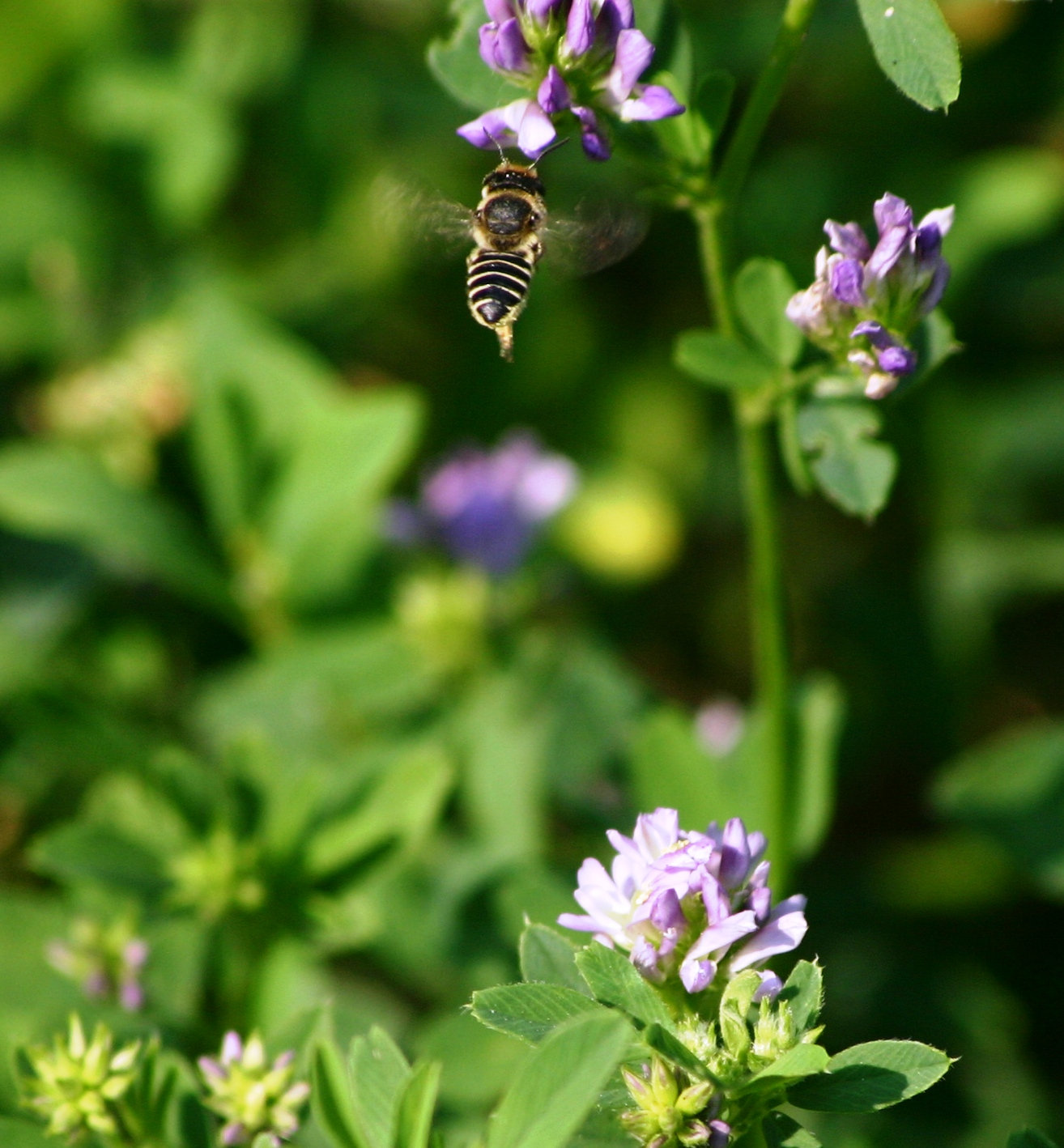
M. rotundata pollinator on alfalfa flower

Megachile rotundata was accidentally introduced into the United States during the 1940s, and its management as a pollinator leads to increases in seed production of some crops in the U.S. It has been shown to pollinate these plant species:

- Medicago sativa
- Other Legumes
- Brassica napus
- Trifolium spp.
- Vaccinium angustifolium

Such behaviors as gregarious nesting, use of leaves and nesting materials that have been mass-produced by humans, efficient pollination of M. sativa, and synchronous emergence of adult bees during alfalfa blooming period provide positive benefits for the use of these bees in agricultural development.

When these bees are supplied to farmers for pollinating crops, they are usually supplied in a dormant state called prepupal, and kept in such state by a constant temperature of about 7 °C (45 °F). At a time that is appropriate for the crop's flowers, the farmer puts the prepupal form in an incubating environment, a constant temperature around 27 °C (81 °F) The adult bees emerge from the pupal form after about 25 days at that temperature. Then, the farmer brings the bees to the field.

== See also ==
- List of Megachile species
