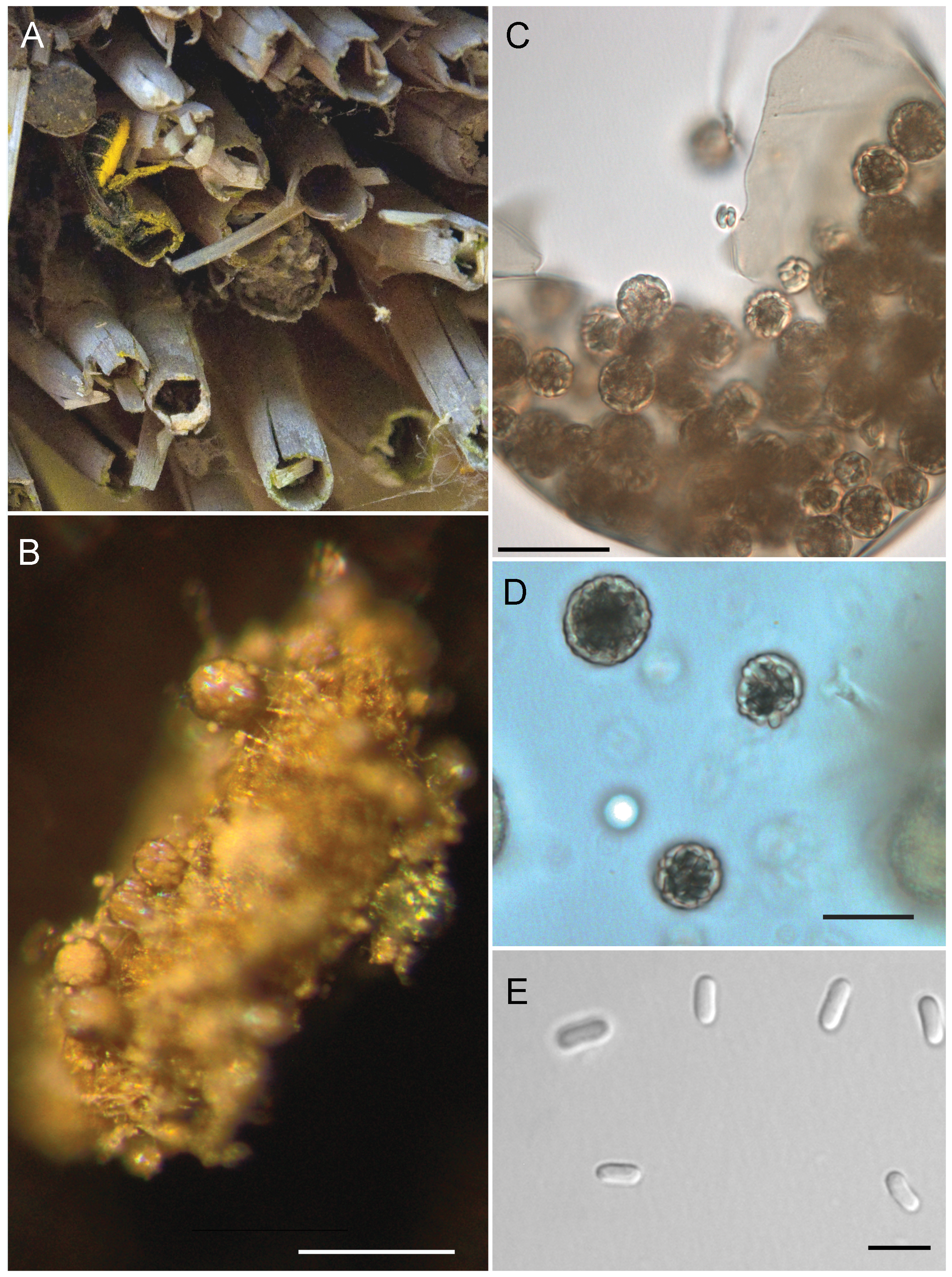
- A) habitat. Phragmites reeds and female Chelostoma florisomne returning with pollen for her brood. B) fecal pellet of C. florisomne larva covered with spore cysts; pale spore balls are visible through the transparent spore cyst wall. C) close-up of spore cyst showing spore balls and smooth, unornamented spore cyst wall. D) spore balls. E) bacilliform ascospores.

Scientific classification
- Kingdom: Fungi
- Division: Ascomycota
- Class: Eurotiomycetes
- Order: Onygenales
- Family: Ascosphaeraceae
- Genus: Ascosphaera
- Species: A. callicarpa

Binomial name
- Ascosphaera callicarpa A.A.Wynns (2013)

= Ascosphaera callicarpa =

Species of fungus

Ascosphaera callicarpa is a fungus common on the larval feces of the solitary bee Chelostoma florisomne, which nests in the Phragmites reeds of thatched roofs in Europe.

Pathogenic Ascosphaera species afflict only the larval stage of bees. Typically, diseased larvae die in the larval stage; in rare occurrences, however, larvae have been observed to enter pupation before being overcome by the fungus.

== Description ==
The mating system is heterothallic. Infected larvae appear shrunken, pale buff, covered by a weft of hyphae, with or without the production of ascomata. The ascomata are greenish (immature) to black (mature) spore cysts produced on aerial hyphae above the larval cuticle, measuring 40–119 μm in diameter. The spore wall is pale greenish to yellowish-brown, nearly smooth with minute punctae at high magnification. Spore balls are hyaline to pale yellowish, without granules, 7–20 μm in diameter, and mostly persistent. The ascospores are ellipsoid to somewhat sausage shaped, and measure 2.1–3.9 by 1.1–1.7 μm. Cultures grown on Sabouraud dextrose agar show rapid growth after 2–6 days; they are white with abundant production of spore cysts when both mating strains are present.

== Ecology and distribution ==
Ascosphaera aggregate is an obligate pathogen with a preference for bees belonging to the family Megachilidae. This species has a broad distribution, with reports from both North America and Europe.

This fast-growing saprotroph is associated primarily with solitary bees. This species is typically found growing on pollen provisions. Less common substrates from which A. agra has been isolated include the surface of a diseased M. rotundata larva with chalkbrood caused by A. aggregate, from pollen within the gut of an otherwise healthy M. rotundata larva and from the honey of A. mellifera. Ascosphaera agra is the only species of the genus that has been found growing on plant material (grass silage) outside of the bee habitat. Pathogenicity studies demonstrated that A. agra is not a pathogen of solitary bees; however it has been concluded that it is a weak pathogen of honeybees.
