= Annie Betts =

British apiculturist and expert on bee diseases

Annie D. Betts
- Born: 1884
- Died: 1961 (aged 76–77)
- Citizenship: United Kingdom
- Occupations: aeronautical engineer, apiculturist, bee disease expert, author and editor
- Writing career
- Language: English
- Genre: scientific writing
- Subject: Bees
- Notable works: Diseases of Bees: Their Signs, Causes and Treatment

Annie Dorothy Betts (1884 – 8 September 1961) was a British mathematician, aeronautical researcher, apiculturist, bee disease expert, author and editor. She made scientifically significant observations on honeybees, wrote books on apiculture, and edited the journal Bee World.

== Life ==
Betts graduated in Mathematics from the University of London in 1906.

Betts was first published in 1912 when she wrote an article on the fungi Pericytis alvei. She was the first to describe that species. In 1972 P. alvei was given a new combination and included in the newly described genus Bettsia. This genus was named in her honour.

During the First World War, Betts worked at the Royal Aircraft Establishment, Farnborough as an aeronautical engineer. Her work from this resulted in two publications: Empirical Formulae for a Variable Pitch Airscrew, with Applications to the Prediction of Aeroplane performance (1919) and The Effect of Variable Gearing on Aeroplane Performance (1923).

She was a member of the Apis Club and was the editor of its journal Bee World from 1929 to 1949. Betts was also a prolific contributor to that journal and published over 170 articles on various subjects relating to honeybees within its pages. After ensuring the continued success of Bee World during two world wars, Betts retired as editor in 1949. She left the journal in a sound financial position. Betts died in 1961.

== Selected works ==
- The fungi of the beehive. (1912) Journal of Economic Biology 7, pp. 129–162
- Practical Bee Anatomy. (1923) The Apis Club, Benson
- The Constancy of the Pollen-collecting Bee. (1920) Bee World, 2(1–4), pp. 10–11 – via Taylor & Francis (subscription required)
