= Arrhenosphaera =

Scientific classification
- Kingdom: Fungi
- Division: Ascomycota
- Class: Eurotiomycetes
- Order: Onygenales
- Family: Ascosphaeraceae
- Genus: Arrhenosphaera; Stejskal (1974)

Type species
- Arrhenosphaera craneae Stejskal (1974)

Genus of fungi

Arrhenosphaera is a fungal genus in the family Ascosphaeraceae. This is a monotypic genus, containing the single species Arrhenosphaera craneae.
