= Bettsia =

Scientific classification
- Kingdom: Fungi
- Division: Ascomycota
- Class: Eurotiomycetes
- Order: Onygenales
- Family: Ascosphaeraceae
- Genus: Bettsia; Skou

Type species
- Bettsia alvei (Betts) Skou

Genus of fungi

Bettsia is a genus of fungi within the Ascosphaeraceae family. This is a monotypic genus, containing the single species Bettsia alvei. Alvei was first described by Annie Betts and this genus is named for her.
