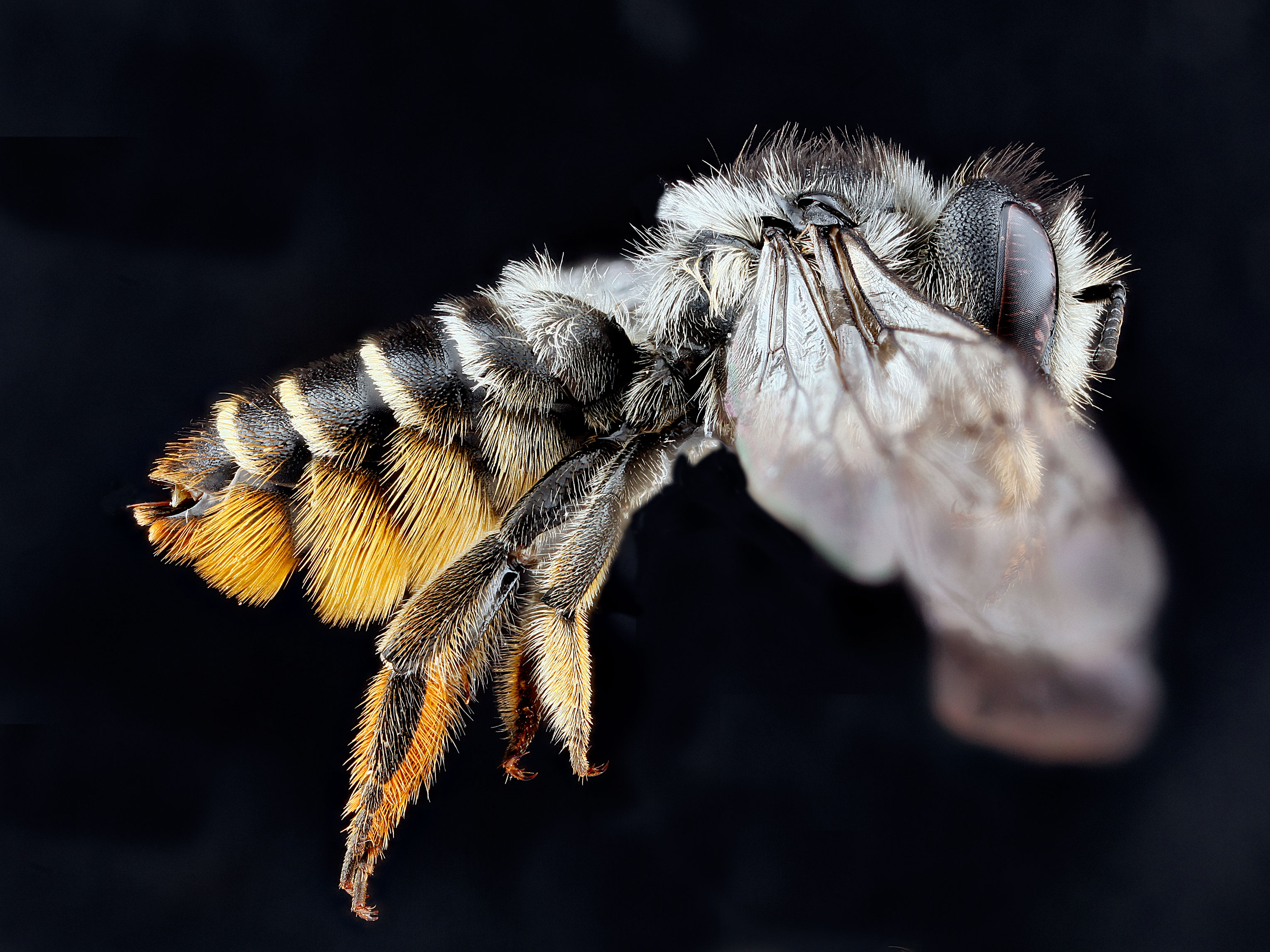

Scientific classification
- Kingdom: Animalia
- Phylum: Arthropoda
- Class: Insecta
- Order: Hymenoptera
- Family: Megachilidae
- Genus: Megachile
- Species: M. relativa

Binomial name
- Megachile relativa Cresson, 1878

= Megachile relativa =

Species of leafcutter bee (Megachile)

Megachile relativa is a species of bee in the family Megachilidae. It was described by Ezra Townsend Cresson in 1878.
