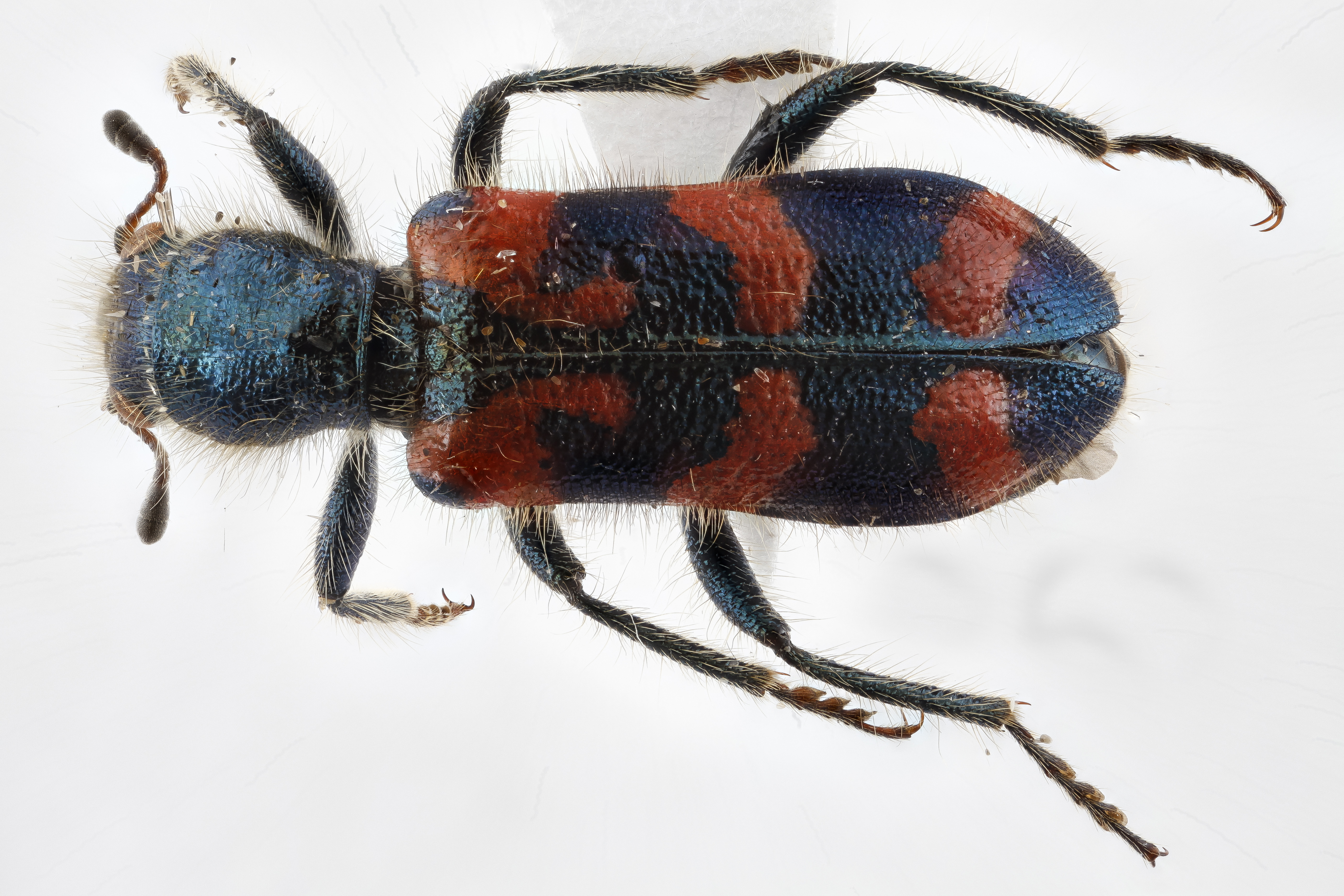
- Trichodes ornatus on October 16, 2012 in Wyoming

Scientific classification
- Domain: Eukaryota
- Kingdom: Animalia
- Phylum: Arthropoda
- Class: Insecta
- Order: Coleoptera
- Suborder: Polyphaga
- Infraorder: Cucujiformia
- Family: Cleridae
- Genus: Trichodes
- Species: T. ornatus

Binomial name
- Trichodes ornatus Say, 1823

= Trichodes ornatus =

Species of beetle

Trichodes ornatus, commonly known as ornate checkered beetle, is a beetle species of checkered beetles belonging to the family Cleridae, subfamily Clerinae which can be found only in North America.

== Ecology ==
Larvae live in bee nests of mostly Megachilidae family species and are parasitic. While in the nest they feed on the bees' larvae or pollen. When they mature into an adult they begin feeding on yarrow, milkweed, and other plants of yellow colouration. The species males are 5–11 millimetres (0.20–0.43 in) long while females are 7–15 millimetres (0.28–0.59 in).
