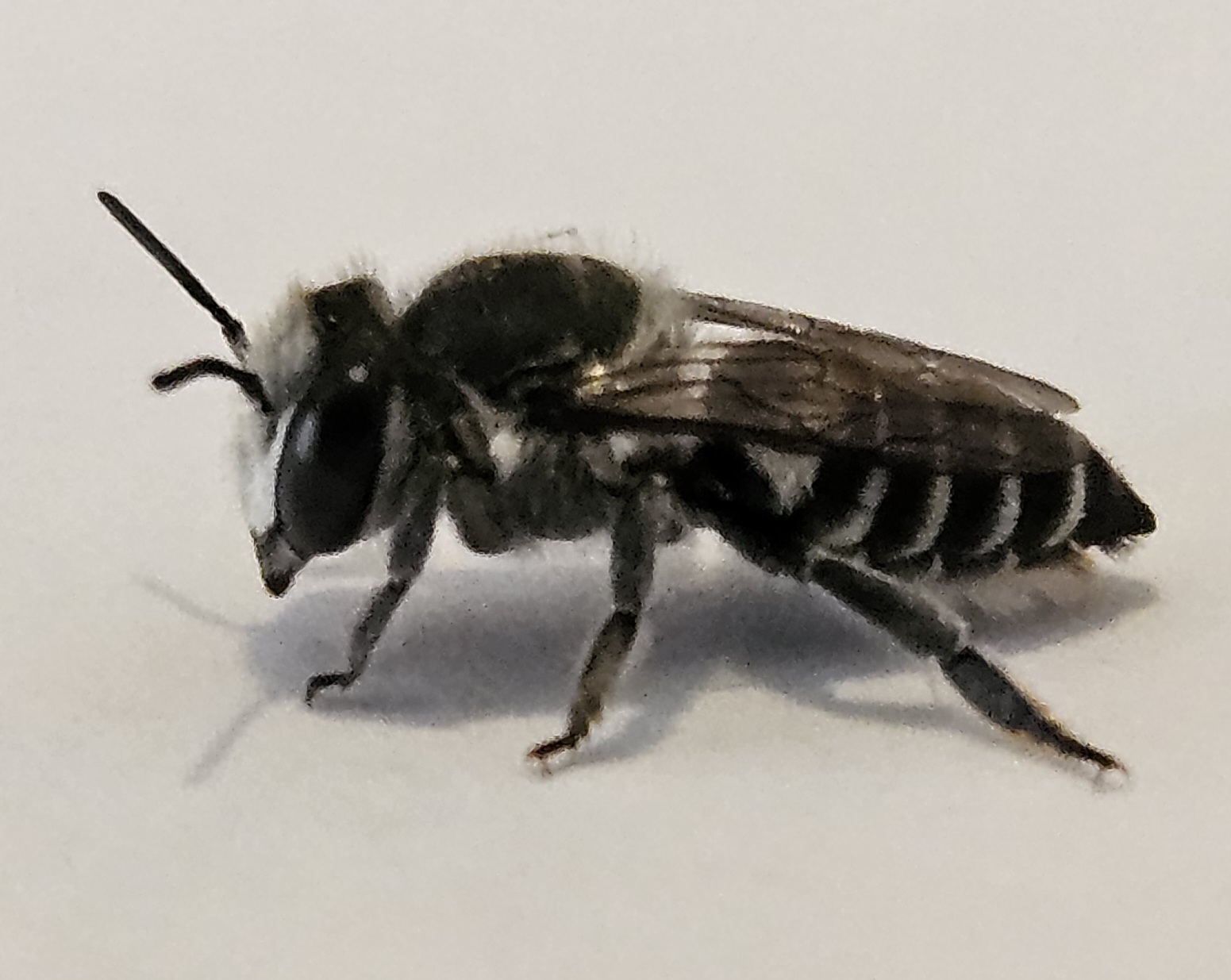
- A female

Scientific classification
- Kingdom: Animalia
- Phylum: Arthropoda
- Clade: Pancrustacea
- Class: Insecta
- Order: Hymenoptera
- Family: Megachilidae
- Genus: Megachile
- Subgenus: Eutricharaea; Thomson, 1872

= Eutricharaea =

Subgenus of bees

Eutricharaea is the largest subgenus of the bee genus Megachile, comprising approximately 240 species. They are native to Europe, Asia, Africa and Australia. Several species have been introduced to the Americas and New Zealand. They range from 5 – 16 mm in length. Many species are black, with pale hair bands on the abdomen. Nesting usually takes place in pre-existing cavities, and the females use leaf discs and pieces of petal to construct the brood cells.
