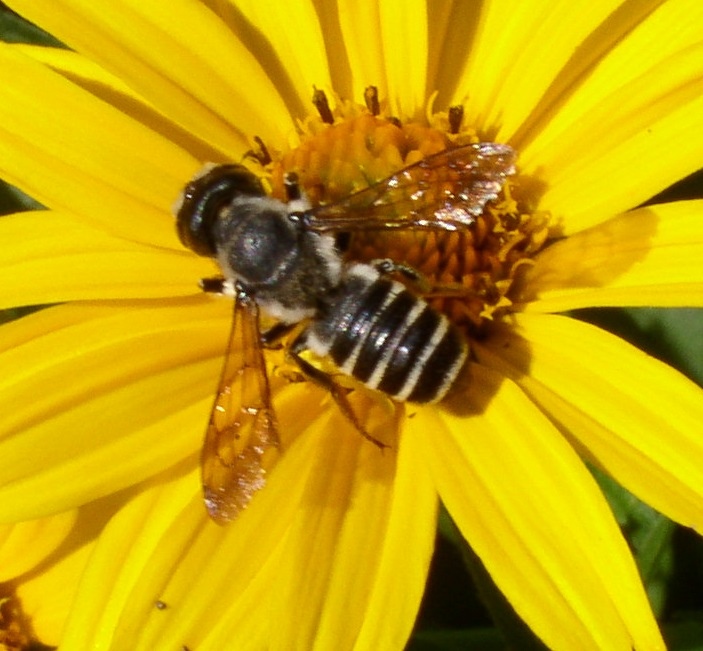
- Megachile pugnata pugnata

Scientific classification
- Kingdom: Animalia
- Phylum: Arthropoda
- Clade: Pancrustacea
- Class: Insecta
- Order: Hymenoptera
- Family: Megachilidae
- Genus: Megachile
- Species: M. pugnata

Binomial name
- Megachile pugnata Say, 1837

= Megachile pugnata =

Species of leafcutter bee (Megachile)

Megachile pugnata is a species of North American bee in the family Megachilidae. It was described by Thomas Say in 1837. M. pugnata is a larger species of Megachile, with the typical female’s body length ranging from 12-18 mm and the male’s 11-13 mm. The outer carapace of both the male and female is completely black in color. Females’ eyes are black as well, while the males have lighter colored grey/green eyes. The ventral aspect of females’ abdomens are characterized by rows of densely packed hairs, which facilitate the collection of pollen. Males have much less densely packed rings of hairs between each segment of the abdomen. Both males and females have large mandibles, an important attribute for the females who use them to slice through leaves to create their nests. The females have a pointed end to their abdomen while the male's abdomen has a clublike, rounded terminus. The female's limbs are all covered in hairs while the male's fore-limbs are heavily modified with a dense brush of bright yellow hair.

== Behaviors ==
=== Nest building ===
M. pugnata build their nests in small hollow cavities found in nature or man made. The cavities they prefer to use are long, slender, and tube-shaped. They have shown previously to prefer cavities with diameters that are 1/4 in (6 mm) to 5/16 in (8 mm), but have also been seen making nests in cavities ranging in diameter from 3/8 in (10 mm) to 3/16 in (5 mm). They also preferentially nest near old cavities previously used by other M. pugnata; however, they do not prefer to use the exact same cavities that they themselves have previously used. It has been proven that they prefer to choose cells with the scents of old nest cells, cocoons, and even feces. As they are a Megachile species, they use their large mandibles to slice through leaves which they will use to line the inside of their nests. Once they have lined their nest with leaves, they gather pollen and nectar to feed their young. They create a pollen and nectar ball in the back of the nest, then lay an egg on it, then create a plug to separate the first cell to the next cell. These plugs can be made from a variety of materials, including mud, sand, chewed leaves, whole leaves, and grasses. The various plugs have different appearances, with the mud-sand plugs often darker and much smoother than the vegetative plugs. The females on average make 3-4 cells each with one pollen and nectar ball and one egg in it before finding another cavity to make another nest.They take about 1 day to make a single cell in the nests.

=== Foraging ===
As adults, M. pugnata feed entirely on flowers in the Asteracea family. This family of plant includes sunflowers, asters, daisies, and various other flowers. When collecting nectar and pollen for themselves and their offspring to eat, they only take from these flowers.

=== Formation of larval feed and oviposition ===
The process of creating the pollen and nectar ball for its young takes many foraging trips in and out of the nest. The M. pugnata female makes multiple trips to collect pollen before returning it to her nest. Then the female subsequently leaves her nest to collect nectar to deposit. She then goes in and out of her nest cavity multiple times either backing in the abdomen first to knock off the pollen on her abdomen and hind legs or face first to deposit nectar into the pollen. The female will use her mandibles to mash the pollen and nectar together to form a nutritious paste for her offspring to eat and to form it into the correct shape. The final step of creating the pollen and nectar food ball for her offspring is to expel a large amount of nectar onto one small area to create a spot on which to lay her egg. She then turns around and lays a single egg directly onto this wet spot she created. Laying the egg takes on average about 60 seconds. The female then immediately leaves the nest and starts sealing off that cell using a plug, so she can start creating another pollen ball for her next egg.

== Life stages ==
=== Eggs ===
The eggs when laid are 1 to 1.5 mm by 3-4 mm, and are relatively straight and oblong in shape. As the egg develops it changes in color from opaque to translucent. On average the eggs take about 6 days to hatch into a 1st instar larva. Once it hatches, it begins feeding on the pollen ball left by its mother.

=== Larvae and pupae ===
During early stages, 1st to 2nd instar, the larvae only feed on the area of the pollen ball with extra nectar content that the mother made and laid the egg on. Once in the 3rd instar, the larvae start to feed on the rest of the pollen mass using its mandibles. It then feeds on the pollen mass for roughly 6.5 days growing from 3rd to 5th and final instar. The larva does not produce any frass until it molts into its final instar. It then takes another roughly 15 days of feeding and growing as a 5th instar before the larva spins its cocoon. As the larva grows in its final instar, the larvae’s excrement is left as numerous pellets dropped behind it. Once it is ready the larva begins to create its cocoon.The larva creates silk by using its salivary lips to anchor silk to various points inside the cell. The larva first lays down a layer of silk on the walls. Then when there is a sufficient layer of silk on the walls, the larva starts to anchor more strings to pellets of frass present around all of the edges of the cell. It continues to create an increasingly dense web of silk around the edge of the cell. The larva then spreads a clear liquid around the inside of the cocoon creating a final layer of cocoon.The larva will overwinter in this cocoon as a prepupa. When winter is over and temperatures rise in the spring, they pupate. Pupation on average takes roughly 22.3 days. The male pupation is shorter, and they emerge before females

=== Adults ===
The adult M. pugnata emerge in early spring, with the males emerging first. The males, after mating with the females soon after their emergence, quickly die. The females live around 2 months, during which time they lay 35-40 eggs making multiple different nests. Their NatureServe conservation status is at G5, indicating that they are not at risk.

== Range ==
M. pugnata is found only in North America in Canada and the United States. Its Canadian east to west range is from Prince Edward Island to British Columbia and the north to south range is from Canada’s southern border to the Northwest Territories and the Yukon. In the United States, its native range extends as far south as Georgia and as far west as southern California. It has not been observed in parts of the Great Plains, the Great Basin and the Gulf Coast.

== Agricultural use ==
M. pugnata is an excellent pollinator for sunflowers as they make trips early in the day when male sunflowers are releasing pollen, making large amounts of pollen available for the bees to transport and for ample pollination of female sunflowers to occur. However, there are some issues with the agricultural use of these bees. Unlike other species of this genus, such as the currently commercially utilized Megachile rotundata, M. pugnata does not have individual cells wrapped in leaves, but cells partitioned by plugs. Therefore, in agricultural use, the cells cannot be easily separated. This increases the risk of significant parasite and fungal infections of these bees because newly adult bees often must chew through dead larvae in order to exit their cell. M. pugnata have multiple known parasites. They are parasitized by a melittobia and monodontomerus wasp species as well as the cuckoo bee species, Coelioxys alternata. These dead larvae could have fungal spores or be parasitized by parasitoids, which could then infect the emerging bee as they chew through the dead bees on emergence.

== Taxonomy and phylogony ==
M. pugnata is in the subgenus Sayapis. Sayapis bees are only found in North and South America where there are 25 species in this subgenus. M. pugnata is the only one in this sub genus that is found in Canada. M. pugnata is in the genus Megachile, which has over 1,400 species in it. Subsequently it is also in the subfamily Megachilinae, having over 4,000 species.
