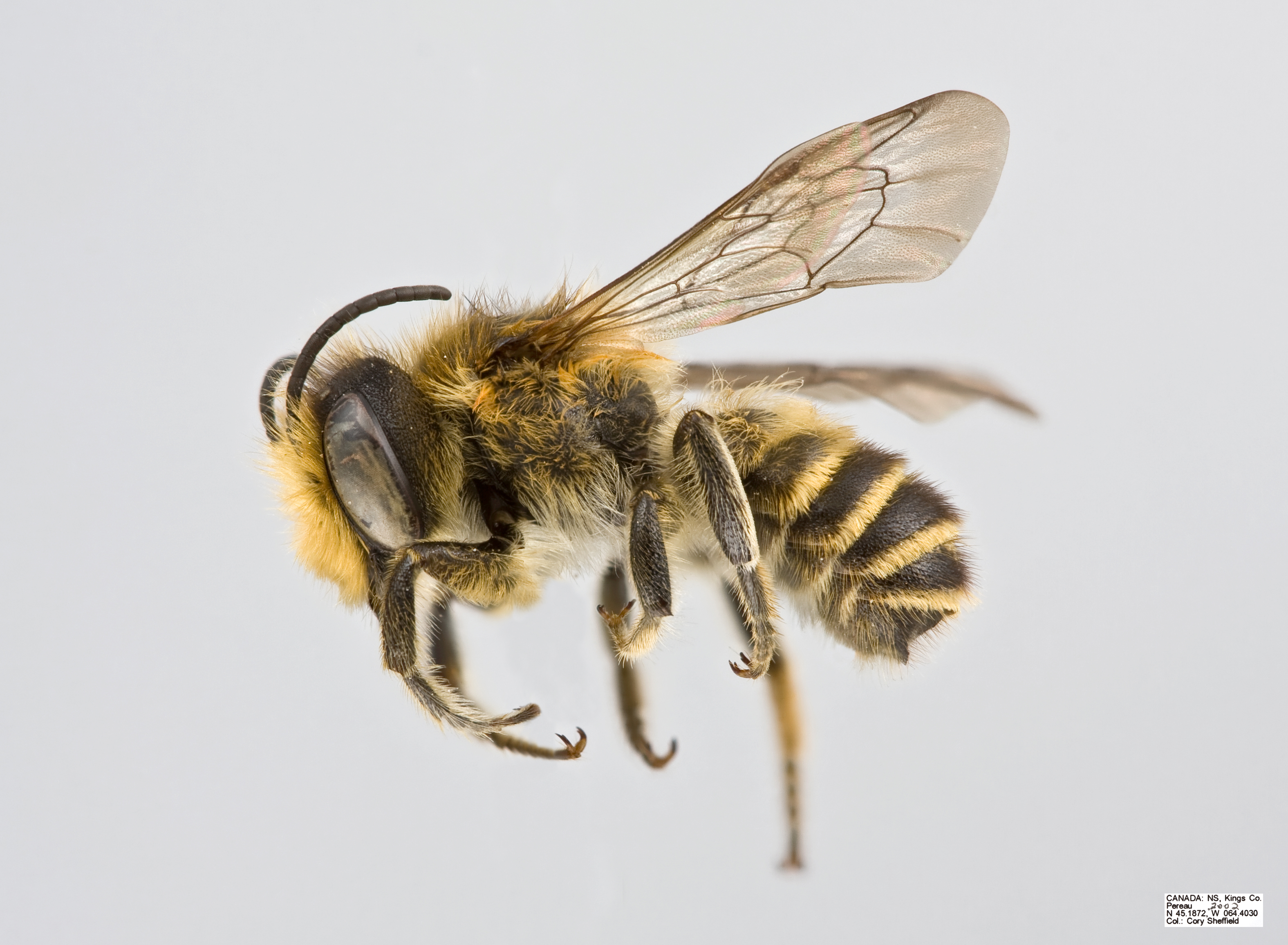

Scientific classification
- Kingdom: Animalia
- Phylum: Arthropoda
- Class: Insecta
- Order: Hymenoptera
- Family: Megachilidae
- Genus: Megachile
- Species: M. centuncularis

Binomial name
- Megachile centuncularis (Linnaeus, 1758)

Synonyms
- Apis fastosus Harris, 1776; Megachile parvula Lepeletier, 1841; Megachile infragilis Cresson, 1878; Megachile rufiventris Schenk, 1851; Megachile appia Nurse, 1903; Megachile leoni Titus, 1906

= Megachile centuncularis =

Species of bee

Megachile centuncularis, commonly known as the patchwork leafcutter bee, is a species of bee in the family Megachilidae. It was first described by the Swedish naturalist Carl Linnaeus in 1758.

== Description ==
The Megachilidae are long-tongued, solitary bees, characterized by a rectangular labrum, the flap-like structure at the front of the mouth. They carry pollen on hairs on the underside of the abdomen. This species is about two centimetres (0.79 in) long and is largely black, the abdominal segments being fringed with golden hairs and the underside of the abdomen being clad with orange hairs.

== Distribution ==
Megachile centuncularis is native to the northern hemisphere, being present in both North America and Eurasia. In western Europe, its range extends from Norway, Sweden and Finland southward to Spain and Italy. It occurs in eastern Ireland, and in Britain, especially in the southern part of the country. It is generally a common species and visits gardens in both rural and urban areas.

== Ecology ==
The adult bee feeds on nectar obtained from various flowers, particularly thistles and brambles. It collects pollen to provision the nest from a wide range of flowers, including those of the families Asteraceae, Fabaceae and Hypericaceae.

This bee makes its nest in a variety of locations; in wood, in hollow stems, in wall cavities or crevices, or even soil, and has been known to use an upturned flowerpot. The bee uses its jaws like scissors to cut pieces of leaf to place in the nest; often rose leaves are used, or honeysuckle, horse chestnut, ash, birch or lilac. At the nest site, pieces of leaf are rolled up, provisioned with pollen, and one egg is laid in each package. Finally the nest entrance is sealed with about six discs of leaf.

Like other bees in temperate regions, M. centuncularis overwinters before emerging from the nest, either as a pupa, or as a fully developed larva.
