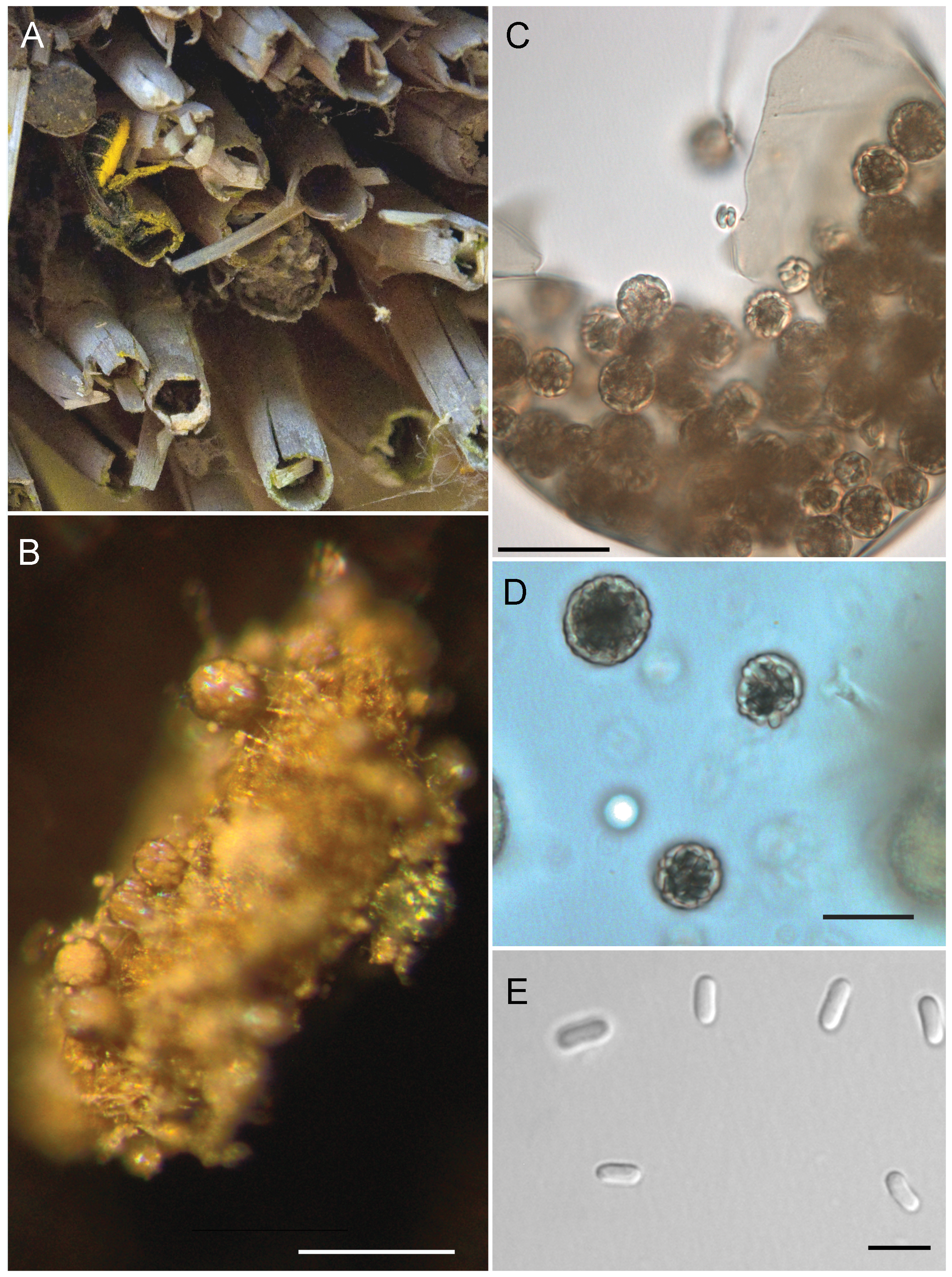
- Ascosphaera callicarpa

Scientific classification
- Kingdom: Fungi
- Division: Ascomycota
- Class: Eurotiomycetes
- Order: Onygenales
- Family: Ascosphaeraceae; L.S.Olive & Spiltoir (1955)

Type genus
- Ascosphaera L.S.Olive & Spiltoir (1955)

Genera
- Arrhenosphaera; Ascosphaera; Bettsia

= Ascosphaeraceae =

Family of fungi

The Ascosphaeraceae are a family of fungi in the Ascomycota, class Eurotiomycetes.
