= Lindsay Shepherd Olive =

American mycologist (1917–1988)

- Born: 30 April 1917; Florence, South Carolina, USA
- Died: 19 October 1988 (aged 71); Highlands, North Carolina
- Education: University of North Carolina at Chapel Hill
- Scientific career
- Fields: Mycology
- Workplaces: Louisiana State University
- Author abbrev. (botany): L.S.Olive

Lindsay Shepherd Olive (April 30, 1917 – October 19, 1988) was an American mycologist known for his broad contributions to fungal taxonomy, cytogenetics, genetics, and slime mold biology. Born in South Carolina, Olive was educated at the University of North Carolina at Chapel Hill, where he earned his Ph.D. in 1942. Throughout his academic career, he held positions at several institutions, notably Louisiana State University, Columbia University, and again at Chapel Hill. Olive's research included pioneering genetic studies with the fungus Sordaria fimicola and extensive work on cellular slime molds, culminating in his monograph, The Mycetozoans (1975). Recognized for his scientific achievements, Olive served as president of the Mycological Society of America and was elected a fellow of the National Academy of Sciences.

== Early life and education ==
Lindsay Shepherd Olive was born on April 30, 1917, in Florence, South Carolina, into a family with roots in southern plantation society. His family relocated to Apex, North Carolina, near Raleigh, where Olive grew up. Initially encouraged by his mother to pursue chemistry, he enrolled at the University of North Carolina at Chapel Hill in 1934. After becoming captivated by the teaching of Professor John Couch in a mycology course, Olive changed his major to botany. Olive earned his B.A. in 1938, followed by an M.A. in 1940 and a Ph.D. in 1942, all from Chapel Hill. His early research under professors William Chambers Coker and Couch focused primarily on rust fungi and jelly fungi, laying the foundation for his extensive career in mycological research.

== Academic and research career ==
Following his Ph.D., Olive began teaching at Chapel Hill as an instructor in botany during the challenging years of World War II. In 1944, he took a position with the United States Department of Agriculture in Beltsville, Maryland, working as a mycologist and plant pathologist to address wartime agricultural threats. Although he did not remain long in plant pathology, this period contributed to his early publications.

In 1946, Olive accepted a position as associate professor at Louisiana State University, focusing on jelly fungi and other fungal research. Three years later, he moved to Columbia University, New York, where he significantly expanded his research scope. Olive's research at Columbia included influential work on [fungal genetics using the organism Sordaria fimicola, establishing methodologies that became standard in genetic studies. His contributions during his time at Columbia were recognized when he served as President of the Mycological Society of America.

In 1956, Olive received a Guggenheim Fellowship for his research on jelly fungi in the Society Islands, despite receiving public criticism for the project's perceived frivolity. The fellowship, however, proved productive and substantially influenced his views on fungal taxonomy and evolution. From the late 1950s onward, Olive collaborated extensively with Carmen Stoianovitch on cellular slime molds, culminating in his authoritative 1975 book, "The Mycetozoans".

== Later life and legacy ==
In 1968, Olive returned to the University of North Carolina at Chapel Hill as a distinguished professor, drawn by both professional opportunities and personal affinity for the southern Appalachian region. He contributed to the development and maintenance of the Highlands Biological Station's botanical garden. Olive formally retired in 1982 but continued research and mentorship for another year without salary.

Throughout his career, Olive traveled extensively, conducting research around the globe, discovering numerous new taxa primarily on islands. His legacy includes contributions to various fields within mycology, spanning taxonomy, cytogenetics, fungal genetics, and slime mold biology. Olive received numerous honors, including election as a distinguished mycologist by the Mycological Society of America and fellowship in the National Academy of Sciences.

Throughout his career, Olive extensively traveled globally, discovering numerous fungal species, particularly on islands in Polynesia and the Pacific region. His international reputation as a "naturalist of the old school" was celebrated by colleagues, who likened his pioneering discoveries to those of renowned mycologist Roland Thaxter. Olive's health declined in the mid-1980s due to Alzheimer's disease, leading him to close his laboratory and cease international travel. He died on October 19, 1988, in Highlands, North Carolina.

== Selected works ==
Olive authored around 160 scientific publications across multiple fields within mycology, including fungal taxonomy, genetics, cytogenetics, and slime mold biology.

- Olive, Lindsay S. (1953). "The structure and behavior of fungus nuclei". The Botanical Review. 19 (8): 439–586. doi:10.1007/BF02861804.
- Olive, Lindsay S. (1958). "On the evolution of heterothallism in fungi". The American Naturalist. 92 (865): 233–251. doi:10.1086/282032.
- Olive, Lindsay S.; Kitani, Yasuo (1967). "Genetics of Sordaria fimicola. VI. Gene conversion at the g locus in mutant x wild type crosses". Genetics. 57 (4): 767–782. doi:10.1093/genetics/57.4.767. PMC 1211766. PMID 6082621.
- Olive, Lindsay S.; Stoianovitch, Carmen (1967). "The Protostelida—a new order of the Mycetozoa". Mycologia. 59 (1): 1–29. doi:10.1080/00275514.1967.12018385 (inactive July 1, 2025). PMID 6068269.
- Olive, Lindsay S. (1975). The Mycetozoans. New York: Academic Press. pp. 1–304. ISBN 978-0-12-526250-7.
