= Discamoeba =

Scientific classification
- Domain: Eukaryota
- Phylum: Amoebozoa
- Class: Discosea
- Order: Vannellida
- Family: Discamoebidae
- Genus: Discamoeba Jahn, Bovee & Griffith 1974

Type species
- Discamoeba guttula (Dujardin 1835)

Species
- D. anthyllion; D. guttula (Dujardin 1835)

Genus of amoebae

Discamoeba is a genus of Amoebozoa.
