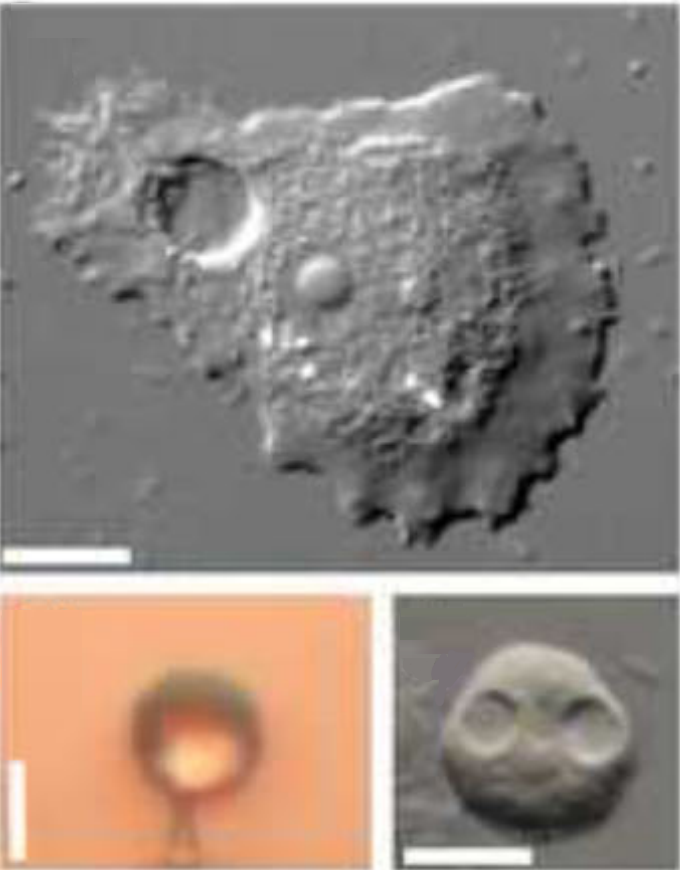
- L. hula trophic cell, sporocarp and spore

Scientific classification
- Domain: Eukaryota
- Phylum: Amoebozoa
- Class: Discosea
- Order: Centramoebida
- Family: Acanthamoebidae
- Genus: Luapeleamoeba
- Species: L. hula

Binomial name
- Luapeleamoeba hula Shadwick & Spiegel 2016

= Luapeleamoeba hula =

Species of acanthamoebid amoeba

Luapeleamoeba hula (from Hawaiian hula) is a species of acanthamoebid amoeba described in 2016, capable of producing protosteloid fruiting bodies that consist of a stalk with one spore. It was obtained from dead māmaki leaves from the Manuka Natural Area Reserve in Hawai'i. It has also been found in the Democratic Republic of Congo.

== Etymology ==
The specific epithet, hula, references how the spore of this species changes shape continuously as if it were dancing.

== Morphology ==
Luapeleamoeba hula sorocarps have an average height of 23.7 μm and are made up of a single spore and an inflexible stalk that's 8.97 μm in length. There is an apophysis at the tip of the stalk, embedded within the spore. The spores are uninucleate and have a continuously variable shape, but typically have the shape of an upside-down pear when viewed from the side and round when viewed from the top. Spores germinate as uninucleate, non-flagellated amoebae, characteristic of the genus. The trophic amoebae are often flabellate on agar surface, with a broad, hyaline, anterior lamellipodium with an average length of 7.3 μm and a short rounded triangular subpseudopodium. The length of the locomotive cells averages 42 μm, and their breadth averages 38 μm. Their cysts are rare and have thin walls.
