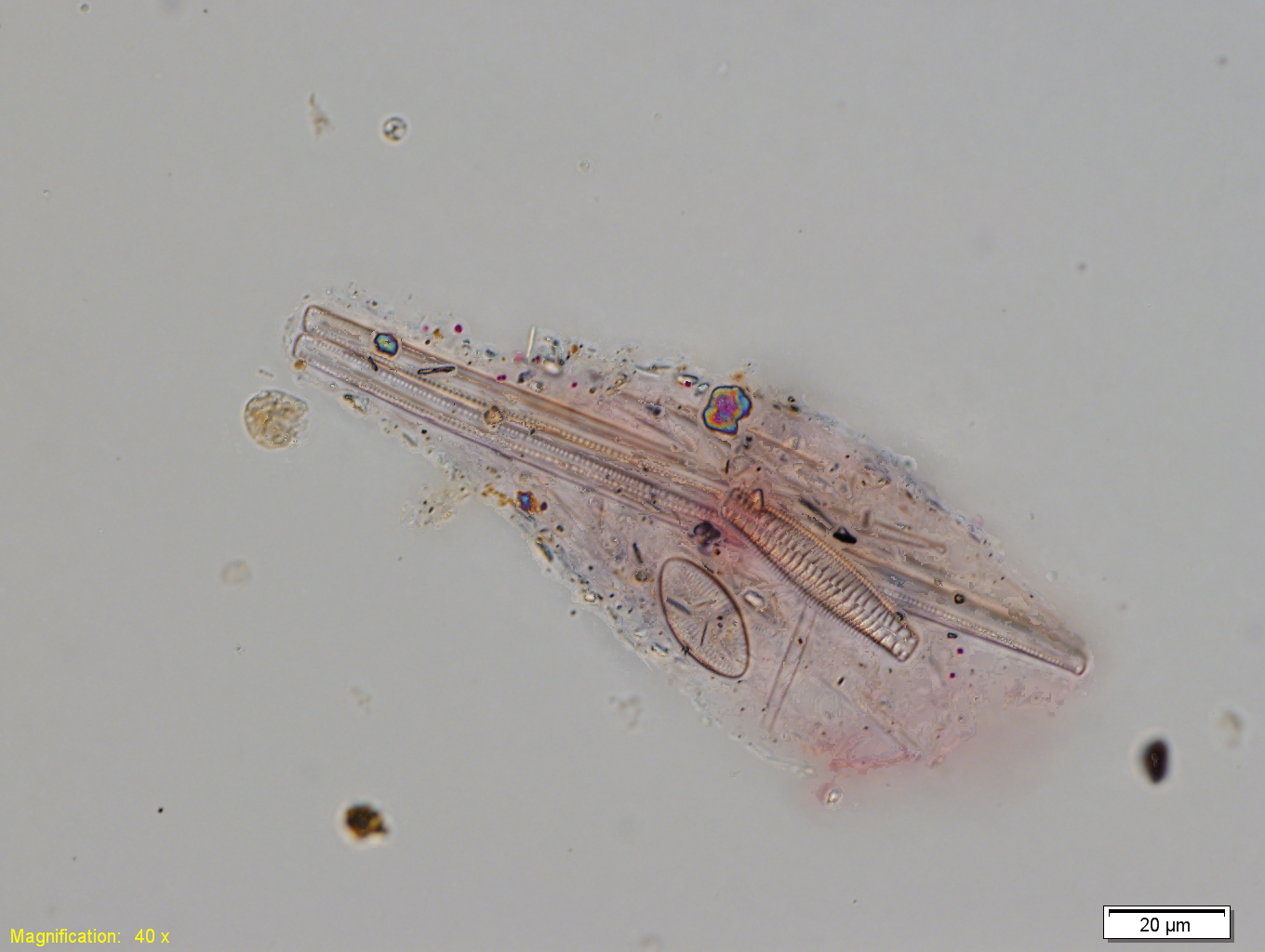
- A preserved specimen of Cochliopodium sp., with some diatoms, from the Eugène Penard collection

Scientific classification
- Domain: Eukaryota
- Phylum: Amoebozoa
- Class: Discosea
- Subclass: Flabellinia
- Order: Himatismenida; Page, 1987

Families and genera
- Parvamoebidae; Parvamoeba; Cochliopodiidae; Chlamydamoeba; Cochliopodium; Ovalopodium

Synonyms
- Cochliopodiida

= Himatismenida =

Order of protozoans

Himatismenida is an Amoebozoa order, in the class Discosea, along with Glycostylida and Dermamoebida. It contains species such as Cochliopodium gallicum.
