= Clydonella =

Scientific classification
- Domain: Eukaryota
- Phylum: Amoebozoa
- Class: Discosea
- Order: Vannellida
- Family: Vannellidae
- Genus: Clydonella; Sawyer, 1975

Type species
- Clydonella vivax (Schaeffer 1926) Sawyer 1975

Species
- C. rosenfieldi Sawyer 1975; C. sawyeri Kudryavtsev & Volkova 2018; C. sindermanni Sawyer 1975; C. vivax (Schaeffer 1926) Sawyer 1975; C. wardi Sawyer 1975

Genus of protozoans

Clydonella is a genus of Amoebozoa.
