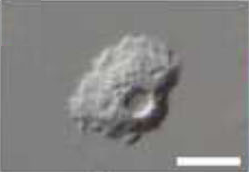
- Luapeleamoeba arachisporum amoeba
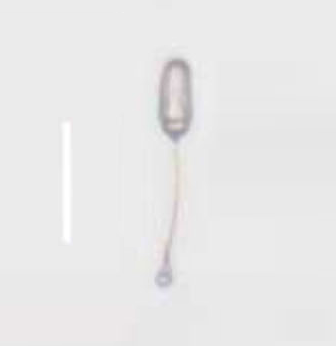
- Luapeleamoeba arachisporum sporocarp

Scientific classification
- Domain: Eukaryota
- Clade: Amorphea
- Phylum: Amoebozoa
- Class: Discosea
- Order: Centramoebida
- Family: Acanthamoebidae
- Genus: Luapeleamoeba; Shadwick & Spiegel 2016

Type species
- Luapeleamoeba hula Shadwick & Spiegel 2016

Species
- L. hula; L. arachisporum

= Luapeleamoeba =

Genus of naked amoebae

Luapeleamoeba is a genus of naked amoebae of the family Acanthamoebidae.

== Morphology ==
Luapeleamoeba are uninucleate amoebae that, during locomotion, generate a single broad, hyaline lamellipodium with inferior triangular pseudopodia at the edge directing the movement. Behind the lamellipodium there's a thick region of cytoplasm with granules containing a contractile vacuole usually posterior to the single nucleus. There is a big nucleolus with a diameter at least half of the nucleus' diameter. There is a centrosomal region near the nucleus with a Golgi apparatus, other vesicles, and an electron-dense lamellate microtubule-organizing center, which is visibly smaller and less lamellate than those seen in other acanthamoeboid genera. The amoeba is thickest near the contractile vacuole and the nucleus, and tapers gradually toward the edges, giving the overall appearance of a small shield volcano. The floating form is round, although not smooth. No flagella have been seen. The cysts are rare. They can form fruiting bodies.

== Taxonomy ==
It contains two species:

- Luapeleamoeba hula Shadwick & Spiegel 2016
- Luapeleamoeba arachisporum (Olive & Stoianovitch 1969) Tice & Brown 2016 (previously "Protostelium" arachisporum)
