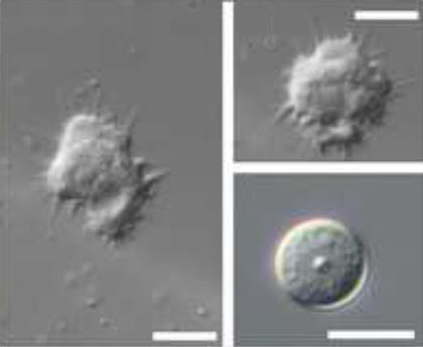
- P. bohemica trophozoites and cysts

Scientific classification
- Domain: Eukaryota
- Phylum: Amoebozoa
- Class: Discosea
- Order: Centramoebida
- Family: Acanthamoebidae
- Genus: Protacanthamoeba; Page, 1981

Type species
- Protacanthamoeba caledonica Page, 1981

Species
- P. bohemica; P. caledonica; P. invadens

= Protacanthamoeba =

Genus of naked amoebae

Protacanthamoeba is a genus of free-living naked amoebae of the family Acanthamoebidae described in 1981. It has been found in associations with mycobacteria in drinking water networks, along with other Acanthamoebidae genera, likely allowing the replication of both environmental and pathogenic mycobacteria.

== Morphology ==
Members of Protacanthamoeba are characterized by having slender, flexible and sometimes furcate subpseudopodia originated from a broad, hyaline lobose pseudopodium, as well as having centrospheres in its interior, including a plaque-shaped centriole-like body. Their cysts lack preformed pores or opercula.

== Taxonomy ==
Protacanthamoeba contains 3 species:

- Protacanthamoeba bohemica Dyková et al. 2005
- Protacanthamoeba caledonica Page 1981
- Protacanthamoeba invadens (Singh & Hanumaiah 1979) Page 1981 (previously Acanthamoeba)
