= Vannella =

Scientific classification
- Domain: Eukaryota
- Clade: Amorphea
- Phylum: Amoebozoa
- Class: Discosea
- Order: Vannellida
- Family: Vannellidae
- Genus: Vannella; Bovee, 1965

Type species
- Vannella mira (Schaeffer 1926) Bovee 1965

Genus of protozoans

Vannella is a genus of Amoebozoa.

It includes the following species:

- V. aberdonica Page 1980
- V. anglica Page 1980
- V. arabica Page 1980
- V. australis (Page 1983) Smirnov et al. 2007
- ?V. bengalensis Das, Mandal & Sarkar 1993
- V. bursella (Page 1974) Smirnov et al. 2007
- V. caledonica Page 1979
- V. calycinucleolus (Page 1974) Smirnov et al. 2007
- V. cirifera (Frenzel 1892) Page 1988
- V. croatica Smirnov et al. 2016
- V. contorta (Moran et al. 2007) Smirnov et al. 2007
- V. crassa Schaeffer 1926
- V. croatica Smirnov et al. 2016
- ?V. curtis Singh & Hanumaiah 1979
- V. danica Smirnov et al. 2007
- V. devonica Page 1979
- V. douvresi (Sawyer 1975) Smirnov et al. 2007
- V. ebro Smirnov 2001
- V. epipetala (Amaral-Zettler et al. 2006) Smirnov et al. 2007
- V. flabellata (Page 1974) Smirnov et al. 2007
- V. langae (Sawyer 1975) Smirnov et al. 2007
- V. lata Page 1988
- V. mainensis (Page 1971) Smirnov et al. 2007
- V. mira (Schaeffer 1926) Bovee 1965
- V. miroides Bovee 1965
- ?V. multimorpha Mote 1968
- V. murchelanoi (Sawyer 1975) Smirnov et al. 2007
- V. nucleolilateralis (Anderson, Nerad & Cole 2003) Smirnov et al. 2007
- V. oblongata (Moran et al. 2007) Smirnov et al. 2007
- V. pentlandii Maciver, Del Valle & Koutsogiannis 2017
- V. peregrinia Smirnov & Fenchel 1996
- V. persistens Smirnov & Brown 2000
- V. placida (Page 1968) Smirnov et al. 2007
- V. platypodia (Glaser 1912)
- V. planctonica Van Wichelen & Vanormelingen 2016
- V. plurinucleolus (Page 1974) Smirnov et al. 2007
- V. pseudovannellida (Hauger, Rogerson & Anderson 2001) Smirnov et al. 2007
- V. schaefferi (Singh & Hanumaiah 1979) Smirnov et al. 2007
- V. sensillis Bovee & Sawyer 1979
- V. septentrionalis Page 1980
- V. simplex (Wohlfarth-Bottermann 1960) Bovee 1965
- V. weinsteini (Sawyer 1975) Smirnov et al. 2007
