= Unda =

Unda or UNDA may refer to:

- Unda (protist), a genus of Amoebozoa
- Unda (plural "undae"), a term for an extraterrestrial dune field
- Unda (organization), the International Catholic Association for Radio and Television which was merged with OCIC to form SIGNIS in 2001
- Unda (film), a Malayalam-language action comedy film
- University of Notre Dame Australia, a private Catholic university in Australia
