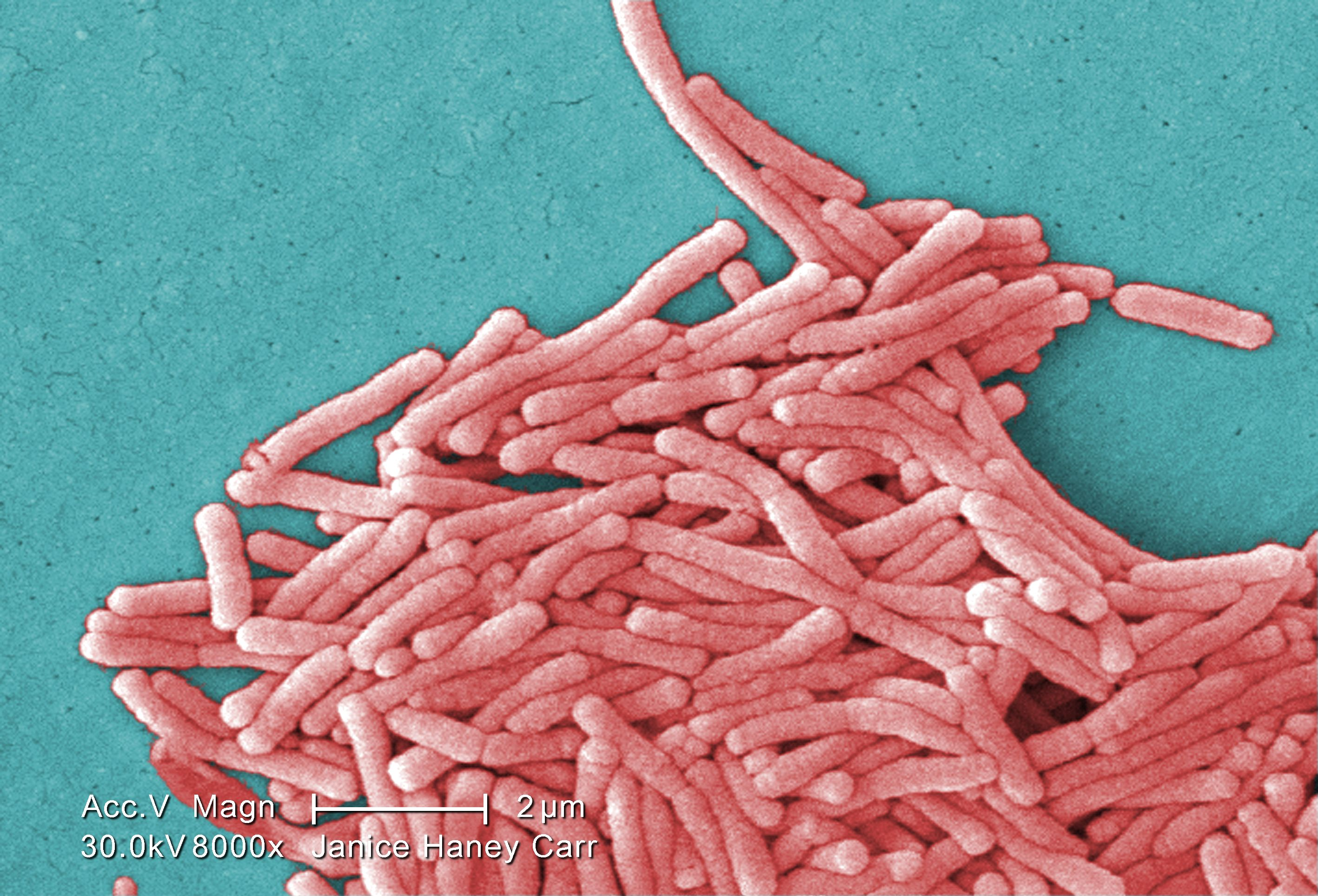
- Colorized scanning electron micrograph image of L. pneumophila

Scientific classification
- Domain: Bacteria
- Kingdom: Pseudomonadati
- Phylum: Pseudomonadota
- Class: Gammaproteobacteria
- Order: Legionellales
- Family: Legionellaceae
- Genus: Legionella
- Species: L. pneumophila

Binomial name
- Legionella pneumophila Brenner DJ, Steigerwalt AG, McDade JE 1979

= Legionella pneumophila =

Species of bacterium

Legionella pneumophila, the primary causative agent for Legionnaires’ disease, is an aerobic, pleomorphic, flagellated, non-spore-forming, Gram-negative bacterium. L. pneumophila is an intracellular bacterium that preferentially infects soil amoebae and freshwater protozoa for replication. Due to L. pneumophila's ability to thrive in water, it can grow in water filtration systems, leading to faucets, showers, and other fixtures. Aerosolized water droplets containing L. pneumophila originating from these fixtures may be inhaled by humans. Upon entry to the human respiratory tract, L. pneumophila is able to infect and reproduce within human alveolar macrophages. This causes the onset of Legionnaires' disease, also known as legionellosis. Infected humans may display symptoms such as fever, delirium, diarrhea, and decreased liver and kidney function. L. pneumophila infections can be diagnosed by a urine antigen test. The infections caused by the bacteria can be treated with fluoroquinolones and azithromycin antibiotics.

== Characterization ==
L. pneumophila is a coccobacillus. It is a Gram-negative, aerobic bacterium that is non-fermentative. It is oxidase- and catalase-positive. L. pneumophila colony morphology is gray-white with a textured, cut-glass appearance; it also requires cysteine and iron to thrive. It grows on buffered charcoal yeast extract agar as well as in moist environments, such as tap water, in "opal-like" colonies. L. pneumophilia is a generally mesophilic bacterium preferring environments between 20 °C and 59 °C and tolerating environments up to 66 °C; death is observed at temperatures at or above 70 °C. The bacterium is also generally tolerate of high NaCl solute concentrations enduring 1.5% sodium chloride in laboratory conditions and up to 3% sodium chloride in vivo.

L. pneumophila is an intracellular bacterium. As an intracellular bacterium, L. pneumophila has a preferential parasitic relationship with protozoa, which serve as a reservoir for the bacterium. This relationship allows the bacterium to shield itself from environmental stressors contributing to its ability to grow quickly. Disinfectants are also often ineffective against the bacterium once an environment has been infected due to their intracellular nature. Resistance to these environmental stressors contributes to the pathogenicity and virulence of the microbe. Predators of bacteria, such as amoeba and ciliates, are natural hosts for L. pneumophila while humans are accidental hosts, as evidenced by there being only one reported case of L. pneumophila human-to-human transmission. Rather than through contagious spread, it infects the alveolar macrophages in human lungs when inhaled as aerosol.

A special characteristic allows for the microbe to thrive in extracellular environments, such as various freshwater environments. This is achieved through its two forms: transmissive and replicative. The transition between the two is activated by changes in the availability of metabolic/nutritional resources in its current environment. The transmissive phase is favored in nutrient-low environments where the bacterium exhibits spore-like character. This form also corresponds with infection, and this virulence is partially characterized by the flagellation of the microbe and a decrease in sodium ion resistance. The replicative form follows to carry out proliferation.

=== Cell membrane structure ===
Since L. pneumophila is a Gram-negative bacterium, its unique outer membrane composed of lipoproteins, phospholipids, and other proteins is the distinguishing feature of Legionella spp. Legionella spp. possess unique lipopolysaccharides (LPS) extending from the outer membrane leaflet of the outer cell membrane that play a role in pathogenicity and adhesion to a host cell. Lipopolysaccharides are the leading surface antigen of all Legionella species including L. pneumophila.

The bases for the somatic antigen specificity of this organism are located on the side chains of its cell wall. The chemical composition of these LPS side chains both with respect to components and arrangement of the different sugars, determines the nature of the somatic or O-antigenic determinants, which are important means of serologically classifying many Gram-negative bacteria. L. pneumophila exhibits distinct chemical characteristics in its LPS structure that distinguish it from other Gram-negative bacteria. The unique attributes are key factors in its serological identity and biological function.

== Ecology ==
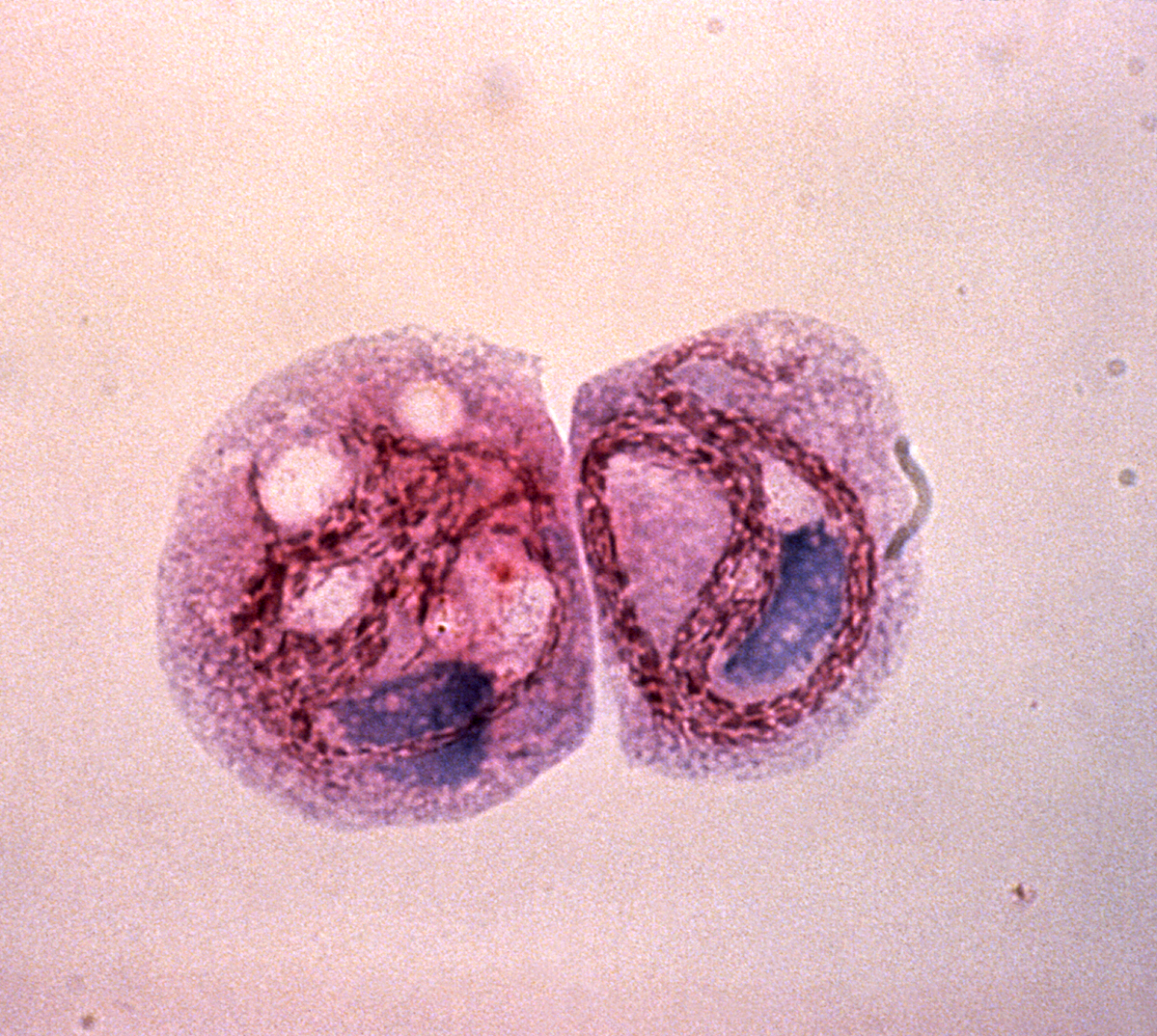
L. pneumophila (red chains) multiplying inside Tetrahymena pyriformis

L. pneumophila is able to live in a diverse range of environmental conditions, tolerating temperatures from 0 °C-63 °C, a pH range of 5.0–8.5, and in dissolved oxygen concentrations of 0.2-15.0 mg/liter. However, it multiplies only within a narrower temperature range of 25 °C to 42 °C.

L. pneumophila is notably resistant to chlorine derivatives that are commonly used to control water borne pathogens. This resistance allows infiltration and persistence in water systems even when standard disinfectant processes are employed. Water supply networks are the main source of L. pneumophila contamination, with the microbe commonly found in places such as cooling towers, water systems of hospitals, hotels, and cruise ships. Of note, this bacterium can form and reside in biofilms within water system pipes, allowing it be aerosolized through fixtures such as faucets, showers, and sprinklers. Exposure to these aerosols can lead to infection in susceptible individuals.

=== Biofilms ===
Biofilms are specialized, surface attachment communities that can consist of one or multiple microbes, ranging from bacteria, algae, and protozoa. These protective matrixes enable the microbe to live for extended periods of time in low-nutrient environments and in the presence of biocides.

L. pneumophila is highly present in water systems, both natural and manmade. L. pneumophila attaches well to plumbing plastics, whereas copper inhibits L. pneumophila attachment. Carbon-rich environments are favorable for L. pneumophila biofilms, as these environments provide nutrients for replication. Studies suggest that L. pneumophila prefers to adhere to pre-established biofilms instead of being the primary microbe to attach to uncolonized surfaces.

The biofilm-forming capabilities of L. pneumophila are heavily correlated with outbreaks in Legionnaires’ disease and stronger virulence. When taking part in multispecies biofilm formation, L. pneumophila persistence is heavily influenced by other microorganisms. Protozoa is one of the most notable microorganisms that influences L. pneumophila persistence, since L. pneumophila utilizes protozoa to replicate itself.

Multispecies biofilm on plumbing systems and in water distribution systems facilitate L. pneumophila growth due to the presence of freshwater protozoa. L. pneumophila has the ability to live independently in biofilms, or can grow intracellularly in protozoa.

== Metabolism ==
L. pnemophila metabolize both carbohydrates and complex polysaccharides minimally, but amino acids are the main carbon and energy source for the bacterium. Amino acids are imported from the host organism and used by L. pneumophila to generate energy through the citric acid cycle (Krebs cycle) and as sources of carbon and nitrogen.

L. pneumophila metabolizes glucose using the Entner-Doudoroff (ED) pathway and pentose phosphate pathway (PP) as well as glycolysis and the citric acid cycle (TCA). Though glucose is not the main carbon source for the bacterium, glucose generates poly-3-hydroxybutyrate (PHB) through the ED pathway, which is a storage molecule converted to acetyl-CoA for use by the TCA cycle (Krebs cycle) when the microbe is nutrient deprived. In addition to glucose, L. pneumophila can use both glycogen and starch as a carbon source using the glucoamylase GamA. The microbes main carbon source is amino acids as it preferentially metabolizes glutamic acid, serine, threonine, and tyrosine. The glutamate-aspartate transaminase reaction was also found to be connected with gluconeogenesis and the citric acid cycle within L. pneumophila. Glycerol is also used as a substrate, as indicated by transcriptome analysis.

=== Nutrient acquisition ===
Legionella is auxotrophic for seven essential amino acids: cysteine, leucine, methionine, valine, threonine, isoleucine, and arginine. Ala, Asp, and Glu are also key amino acids required by the microbe, but they are co-metabolized from host catabolites. Inside the vacuole, nutrient availability is low; the high demand of amino acids is not covered by the transport of free amino acids found in the host cytoplasm. To improve the availability of amino acids, the parasite promotes the host mechanisms of proteasomal degradation using the bacterium's AnkB protein. This generates an excess of free amino acids in the cytoplasm of L. pneumophila-infected cells that can be used for intravacuolar proliferation of the parasite. Amino acids are imported into the LCV through various amino acid transporters such as the neutral amino acid transporter B(0). Even though L. pneumophila primarily uses amino acids as a carbon source, the bacteria does contain multiple amylases, such as LamB which hydrolyzes polysaccharides into glucose monomers for metabolism. The ED pathway is mainly used for glucose metabolism, but the L. pnemophila genome contains genes encoding for a multitude of alternative pathways.

Protein degradation to recycle amino acids and hydrolyzing polysaccharides are not the only methods by which L. pneumophila obtains carbon and energy sources from the host. Type II–secreted degradative enzymes may provide an additional strategy to generate carbon and energy sources. L. pneumophila is the only known intracellular pathogen to have a Type II Secretion System (secretome).

== Genomics ==
There are 15 known serogroups of L. pneumophila, but serogroup 1 is most commonly causes Legionnaires' disease. Serogroups 5 and 10 may also cause rare co-infections. The genomes of six strains, L. pneumophila Philadelphia, L. pneumophila Paris, L. pneumophila Lens, L. pneumophila Corby, L. pneumophila Alcoy, and L. pneumophila 130b were isolated from 2004-2010 which paved the way for understanding the molecular biology of the bacteria.

Subspecies, which are commonly defined by geographical location, share about 80% of their genome with variation between strains that account for the difference in virulence between subspecies. The genome is relatively large of about 3.5 mega base pairs (mbp) which reflects a higher number of genes, corresponding with the ability of Legionella to adapt to different hosts and environments. There is a relatively high abundance of genes encoding eukaryotic-like proteins (ELPs). ELPs are beneficial for mimicking the bacteria's eukaryotic hosts for pathogenicity. Other genes of L. pneumophila encode for Legionella-specific vacuoles, efflux transports, ankyrin-repeat proteins, and many other virulence related characteristics. The bffA gene is associated with biofilm formation, and it is seen that strains without this gene form biofilms both quicker and thicker which aids in resistance to environmental stressors. In-depth comparative genome analysis using DNA arrays to study the gene content of 180 Legionella strains revealed high genomic plasticity and frequent horizontal gene transfer events. Horizontal gene transfer allows L. pneumophila to evolve at a rapid pace and commonly is associated with drug resistance.

== Pathogenesis ==
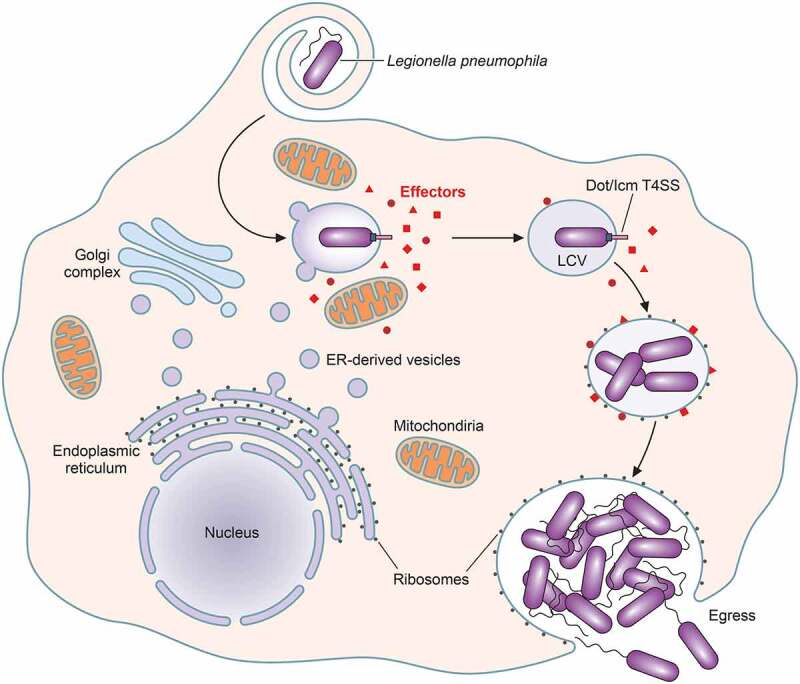
The life cycle of L. pneumophila within a amoeba.

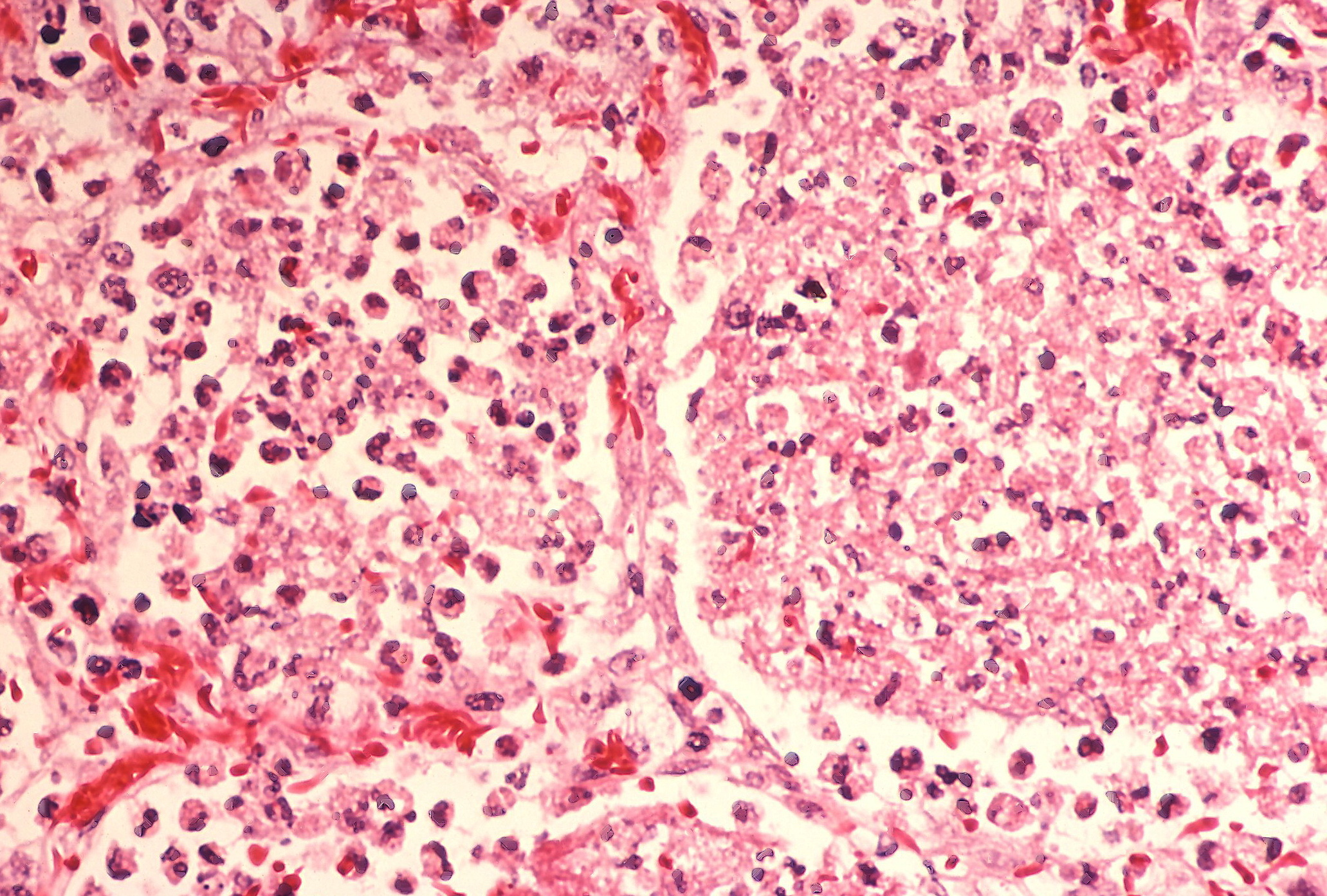
Image of alveoli filled with leukocytes and fibrin due to pneumonia caused by Legionella bacteria.

L. pneumophila is able to invade and replicate within human alveolar macrophages. Internalization of the bacteria appears to occur through phagocytosis or coiling phagocytosis and is reliant on Dot/Icm type 4B secretion system (T4BSS). Once internalized, the Dot/Icm system begins secreting bacterial effector proteins that recruit host factors to the Legionella containing vacuole (LCV). This process prevents the LCV from fusing with the lysosomes that would otherwise degrade the bacteria. Vesicles of the host cell's rough endoplasmic reticulum are attracted to the LCV, and these vacuoles supply the LCV with necessary lipids and proteins. LCV membrane integrity requires a steady supply of host lipids, such as cellular cholesterol and the cis-monounsaturated fatty acid, palmitoleic acid. L. pneumophila replication occurs within the LCV. Once nutrients are depleted, the bacteria gain flagella and cytoxicity. To exit the host cell, L. pneumophila lyses the LCV and resides in the cytoplasm. In the cytoplasm, L. pneumophila inhibit organelle and plasma membrane function and structure which ultimately leads to osmotic lysis of the host cell.

=== Virulence factors ===
==== Membrane based ====
L. pneumophila exhibits a unique lipopolysaccharide (LPS) structure that is highly hydrophobic due to its being densely packed with branched fatty acids, and elevated levels of O-acetyl and N-acetyl groups. This structure helps prevent interaction with a common LPS immune system co-receptor, CD14. There is also a correlation between an LPS with a high molecular-weight and the inhibition of phagosome-lysosome fusion. L. pneumophila produces pili of varying lengths. The two pili proteins: PilE and Prepilin peptidase (PilD) are responsible for the production of type IV pili and subsequently, intracellular proliferation. L. pneumophila possesses a singular, polar flagellum that is used for cell motility, adhesion, host invasion, and biofilm formation. The same regulators that control flagellation also control lysosome avoidance and cytotoxicity. The macrophage infectivity potentiator is another key component of host cell invasion and intracellular replication. MIP displays peptidyl–prolyl cis/trans isomerase (PPIase) activity which is crucial for survival within the macrophage, along with transmigration across the lung epithelial barrier.

L. pneumophila also have unique outer membrane vesicles. L. pneumophila uses these outer membrane vesicles as a mode of infection. The outer membrane vesicles of the bacteria typically attach and fuses with a host cell. These vesicles transport virulence factors and virulence proteins. The outer membrane vesicles not only enhance their virulence, but also improves their survivability as well. L. pneumophila fight off defense mechanisms of their host cell. A prime example of this occurs when outer membrane vesicles prevent the fusion of a host phagosome preventing the bacteria's death.

Another key virulence factor of L. pneumophila is iron acquisition, the microbe utilizes two methods of iron uptake. Ferrous iron is collected through the use of a transport system involving an inner-membrane protein known as protein FeoB. Optimal intracellular infection is achieved in amoebae and macrophages via this transport system. The second form of uptake, involving ferric iron, is achieved through an iron chelator known as legiobactin. This is secreted by L. pneumophila when the microbes are being grown in a low iron chemically designed media.

Significant progress has also been made in identifying surface structures of Legionella pneumophila that contribute to its virulence and intracellular infection. One of the most notable of these surface features is the flagellum. Although the flagellum is not necessarily required for intracellular replication, it promotes host cell invasion through mechanisms that are independent of adherence. A flagellum's expression is regulated by growth conditions and is typically observed only in the motile, virulent phase of the bacterium. It is considered a potential virulence factor, as non-flagellated mutants exhibit reduced infectivity. This is further supported by observations that 1` in the exponential growth phase is non-motile and displays decreased virulence.

==== Protozoan interaction ====
L. pneumophila is capable of infecting and multiplying within various species of free-living protists and amoebas, which further enhances their survivability. Protozoa that are associated with this bacteria are Acanthamoeba, Saccamoeba, and Platyamoeba. These protozoa provides nutrients to the bacteria allowing its longevity to be increased. It is through their growth in environmental protozoa and amoeba that L. pneumophila may persist in man-made water systems. Cyst-forming protozoans allow L. pneumophila to survive harsh environmental conditions such as chlorine, UV, ozonisation, and thermal treatments. Furthermore under stress, protozoa plays an essential role in keeping L. pneumophila alive and can bring them back to life. This bacteria first enters into protozoa in a unique way in order to survive. They build vesicles in order to enter into the host and use them to replicate. This same process is seen when they infect humans as well. In fact scientists believe that L. pneumophila ability to survive in human macrophages is due to how they adapted to survive in protozoa.

=== Legionella-containing vacuole ===
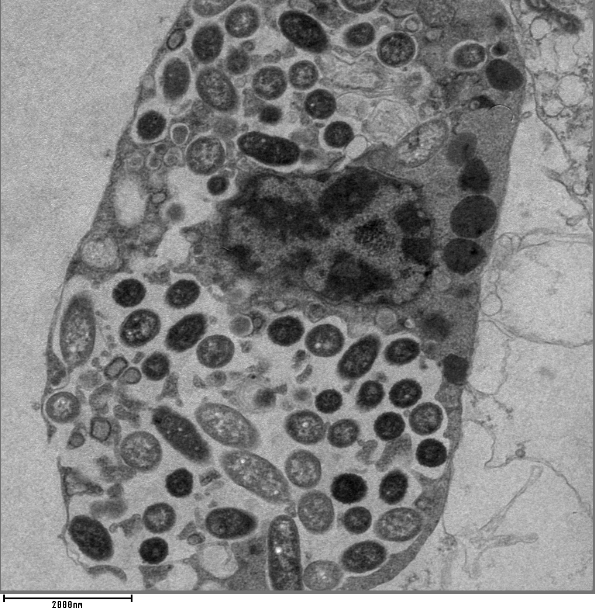
TEM image of L. pneumophila within a phagocytic cell

For Legionella to survive within macrophages and protozoa, it must create a specialized compartment known as the Legionella-containing vacuole (LCV). Through the action of the Dot/Icm secretion system, the bacteria are able to prevent degradation by the normal endosomal trafficking pathway and instead replicate. Shortly after internalization, the bacteria specifically recruit endoplasmic reticulum-derived vesicles and mitochondria to the LCV while preventing the recruitment of endosomal markers such as Rab5a and Rab7a. Formation and maintenance of the vacuoles are crucial for pathogenesis; bacteria lacking the Dot/Icm secretion system are not pathogenic and cannot replicate within cells, while deletion of the Dot/Icm effector SdhA results in destabilization of the vacuolar membrane and no bacterial replication.

=== Detection and treatment ===
Antisera have been used both for slide agglutination studies and for direct detection of bacteria in tissues using immunofluorescence via fluorescent-labelled antibodies. Specific antibodies in patients can be determined by the indirect fluorescent antibody test. ELISA and microagglutination tests have also been successfully applied. A consistent method that has been used to detect the disease is the urine antigen test.

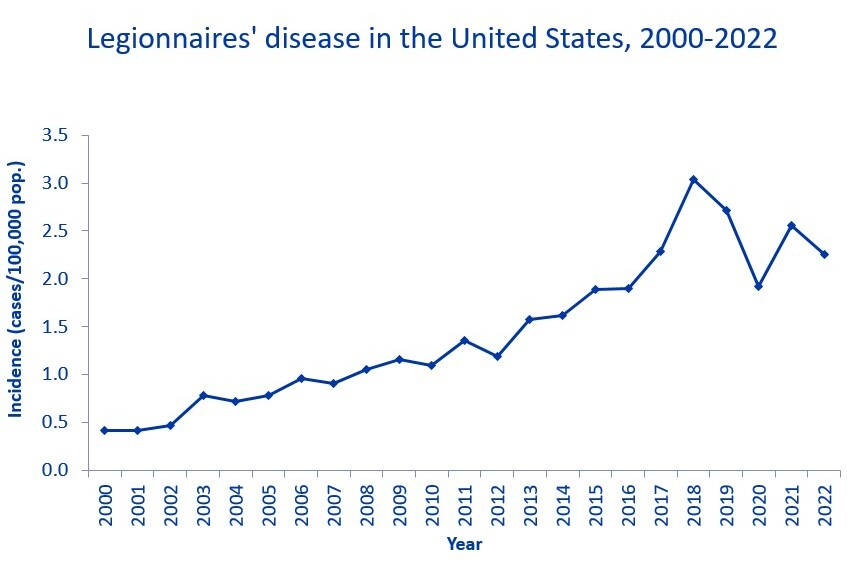
The prevalence of Legionnaires’ Disease, caused by the bacterium L. pneumophila, in the United States from 2000 to 2022.

Effective antibiotic treatment for Legionella pneumonia includes fluoroquinolones (levofloxacin or moxifloxacin) or, alternately, azithromycin. There has been no significant difference found between using a fluoroquinolone or azithromycin to treat Legionella pneumonia. Combination treatments with rifampicin are being tested as a response to antibiotic resistance during mono-treatments, though its effectiveness remains uncertain.

These antibiotics work best because L. pneumophila is an intracellular pathogen. Levofloxacin and azithromycin have great intracellular activity and are able to penetrate into Legionella-infected cells. The Infectious Diseases Society of America recommends 5–10 days of treatment with levofloxacin or 3–5 days of treatment with azithromycin; however, patients that are immunocompromised or have a severe disease may require an extended course of treatment. Enzymes in the iron uptake pathway have been also suggested as important drug targets.

Besides antibiotics, humans also have an innate immune response to combat L. pneumophila. Humans have an innate immune response where pattern recognition receptors (PRR) can sense pathogen associated molecular patterns (PAMPs). Examples of PRR are toll-like receptors and NOD-like receptors. Once these PRR recognize the PAMPs then there is an activation of signaling pathways. This elicits an immune response from humans, which leads to the death of the macrophages where L. pneumophila resides as well as the release of cytokines.

== Prevalence ==
L. pneumophila is the primary causative organism for Legionnaires‘ disease, responsible for over 90% of cases within the United States. Roughly 2 out of 100,000 people are infected each year in the European Union (EU), with an infection rate of approximately 5 per 100,000 in Italy. The highest reported amount of cases in the US, EU, and Italy have been among men over the age of 50. L. pneumophila often infects individuals through poor quality water sources. Approximately 20% of reported Legionnaires’ disease cases come from healthcare, senior living, or travel facilities that have been exposed to water contaminated with L. pneumophila. There may also be an increased risk of contracting L. pneumophila from private wells, as they are often unregulated and not as rigorously disinfected as municipal water systems. Several large outbreaks of Legionnaires’ Disease have come from public hot tubs due to the temperature range of the water being ideal for the bacteria's growth.

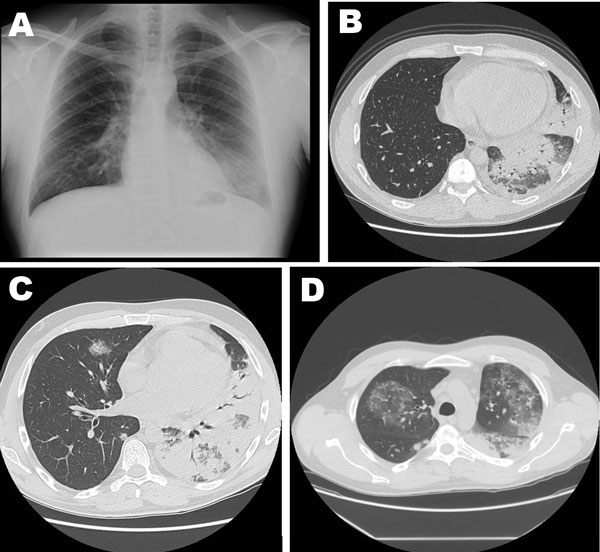
Image shows x-rays of the lungs that depicts a case of pneumonia caused by L. pneumophila.

Legionnaires’ disease gained globally recognition after an outbreak in 1976 at a hotel in Philadelphia, Pennsylvania. The causative agent of the outbreak was L. pneumophila, which had contaminated the hotel's air conditioning water supply, allowing the microbe to be dispersed within the hotel's environment. A prominent mode of transmission for the disease is the inhalation of contaminated water aerosols. The outbreak resulted in a total of 182 reported cases and 29 deaths. This incident piloted research on the disease causing bacteria, as well as, preventative approaches to contamination.

More recently, two outbreaks of Legionnaires’ disease among travelers on two cruise ships between November 2022 and June 2024 were reported by the United States Centers for Disease Control and Prevention (CDC). Hot tubs were identified as the likely source and the cruise lines modified their operation by increasing frequency of cleaning and hyperchlorination among other changes.

Besides Legionnaires’ disease, L. pneumophila is also responsible for Pontiac fever. Pontiac fever occurs when L. pneumophila is in a non-pneumatic form. The first outbreak of Pontiac fever was reported in 1968 in Pontiac, Michigan with approximately 144 cases. During the first outbreak, there was a mandatory 48 hour incubation period. Common symptoms of Pontiac fever include fever and headaches and the illness itself last between 2–5 days. In recent decades, Pontiac fever and Legionnaires’ disease cases have increased.

Using a OneHealth framework is essential to understanding the prevalence of this L. pneumophila. This is because its transmission is entirely driven by interactions between humans, water infrastructure, and environmental conditions. Since the bacterium naturally persists in freshwater and man-made water systems, the risk of human infection greatly increases when environmental management or public health monitoring breaks down. It is because of this interconnectedness that it remains vital that surveillance of water systems and environmental controls are intact and used as clinical detection and treatment.
