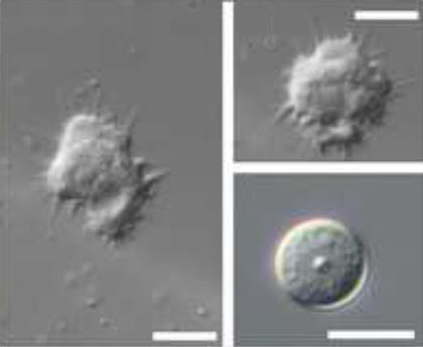
- Protacanthamoeba bohemica trophozoites and cysts

Scientific classification
- Domain: Eukaryota
- Phylum: Amoebozoa
- Class: Discosea
- Order: Centramoebida
- Family: Acanthamoebidae
- Genus: Protacanthamoeba
- Species: P. bohemica

Binomial name
- Protacanthamoeba bohemica Dyková et al., 2005

= Protacanthamoeba bohemica =

Species of amoeba

Protacanthamoeba bohemica is a species of Acanthamoebidae.
