= Echinamoeba thermarum =

Scientific classification
- Domain: Eukaryota
- Phylum: Amoebozoa
- Class: Tubulinea
- Order: Echinamoebida
- Family: Echinamoebidae
- Genus: Echinamoeba
- Species: E. thermarum

Binomial name
- Echinamoeba thermarum Baumgartner et al. 2003

Species of thermophilic amoeba

Echinamoeba thermarum is an extremely thermophilic amoeba species discovered in various hot springs worldwide. It is notable for its ability to thrive at high temperatures, with an optimal growth temperature of 50°C (122°F).

== Taxonomy ==
E. thermarum is classified within the genus Echinamoeba based on morphology and SSU rRNA comparisons. Its species name, "thermarum," refers to its highly thermophilic lifestyle and hydrothermal habitat.

The phylogenetic analysis places Echinamoebida as a clade of thermophilic amoebae within Lobosa (Amoebozoa).

== Habitat and distribution ==
E. thermarum was isolated from hot springs in multiple locations, including:

- Agnano Terme, Italy
- Yellowstone National Park, USA
- Kamchatka, Russia
- Arenal Volcano, Costa Rica

Additional locations have been identified by other researchers:

- Black Canyon geothermal springs of the Colorado River, USA
- Geothermal springs of Taupō Volcanic Zone, New Zealand
- Karymsky Volcano and Valley of Geysers, Russia

The species has adapted to live in hydrothermal environments with temperatures ranging from 33°C (91.4°F) to 57°C (134.6°F).

== Morphology and characteristics ==
E. thermarum morphological features are as follows:

- Flat cells with irregular triangular or elongated shapes
- Fine spine-like sub pseudopodia
- Average size: 22 μm long and 11 μm wide
- Single nucleus with a central nucleolus

The amoeba can be cultured monoxenically on a thermophilic alpha-proteobacterium.

== Evolution and adaptation ==
E. thermarum as an example of adaptation to extreme environments suggests that the evolution of thermophily in amoebae has occurred across multiple distantly related lineages, indicating that the amoeboid form may be particularly well-suited for high-temperature environments.

E. thermarum and other thermophilic amoebae can provide insights into adaptations enabling survival in hot conditions, the relationship between morphological form and thermophilic lifestyle, and functional contributions of thermophilic amoebae to extreme environment ecology.

== Life cycle stages ==
The life cycle of Echinamoeba thermarum includes the following stages:

1. Trophozoite Stage: This is the active feeding stage where the amoeba consumes nutrients from its environment, often utilizing bacteria as a food source. Trophozoites can thrive at temperatures ranging from 33°C to 57°C, with an optimal growth temperature of around 50°C.
2. Encystation: Under unfavorable conditions (e.g., nutrient depletion or extreme environmental changes), Echinamoeba thermarum can undergo encystation. This process allows the amoeba to form a protective cyst that can withstand harsh conditions until favorable conditions return.
3. Cyst Stage: Cysts are dormant forms that provide protection against adverse environmental factors. They can remain viable for extended periods and germinate back into trophozoites when conditions improve.

== Reproductive strategies ==
Echinamoeba thermarum primarily reproduces asexually through binary fission during the trophozoite stage. This method allows for rapid population increases in suitable environments. The specific mechanisms of reproduction during encystation and subsequent germination are less understood but are crucial for survival in extreme habitats.

== Ecological significance ==
E. thermarum is identified as a potential host for Legionella pneumophila, a pathogenic bacterium known to cause Legionnaires' disease. This relationship highlights the importance of understanding the ecology of thermophilic amoebae in both natural and engineered water systems.
