= Lingulamoeba =

Scientific classification
- Domain: Eukaryota
- Clade: Amorphea
- Phylum: Amoebozoa
- Class: Discosea
- Order: Vannellida
- Family: Vannellidae
- Genus: Lingulamoeba; Sawyer, 1975

Species
- Lingulamoeba leei Sawyer 1975

Genus of amoebae

Lingulamoeba is a genus of Amoebozoa.
