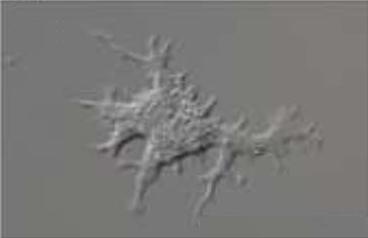
- Trophic cell

Scientific classification
- Domain: Eukaryota
- Clade: Amorphea
- Phylum: Amoebozoa
- Class: Discosea
- Order: Centramoebida
- Family: Acanthamoebidae
- Genus: Dracoamoeba
- Species: D. jomungandri

Binomial name
- Dracoamoeba jomungandri Tice & Brown 2016

= Dracoamoeba =

Genus of naked amoebae

Dracoamoeba is a free-living genus of discosean amoebae in the family Acanthamoebidae containing the sole species Dracoamoeba jomungandri, discovered in 2016 in moist muddy soil close to the ocean shore at Chincoteague, Virginia (United States).

== Etymology ==
The generic name Dracoamoeba comes from the Latin “Draco”, meaning “dragon”, which is what the forms of this amoeba resemble. The specific epithet jomungandri comes from Jörmungandr, the oceanic sea serpent of norse mythology.

== Morphology ==
Members of Dracoamoeba are amoebae with ramose pseudopodia capable of forming one lamellipodium with acanthapodial (i.e. tooth-shaped) subpseudopodia. Pseudopodia of all forms are made up of hyaloplasm, a hyaline cytoplasm that composes the pseudopodia, and are used for locomotion and feeding. Their cell body is made of granuloplasm, a granulose cytoplasm that surrounds the nucleus as opposed to the hyaloplasm.

In particular, D. jomungandri exhibits long, tapering thin ramose pseudopodia from all sides of the main cell body when attached to the surface of a culture flask. In this state, its length ranges from 33 to 87 μm long, with a mean length of 57.6 μm, and its width ranges from 3 to 12 μm, with a mean cell body width of 6.2 μm. Its pseudopodia are composed of hyaloplasm while the main body of the cell is made of granuloplasm. It does not form uroids, traces left by some amoebae during locomotion. No cysts have been observed from this species. Upon starvation, it will shrivel up and detach from the surface, and can remain suspended in the water column or float to the water surface.
