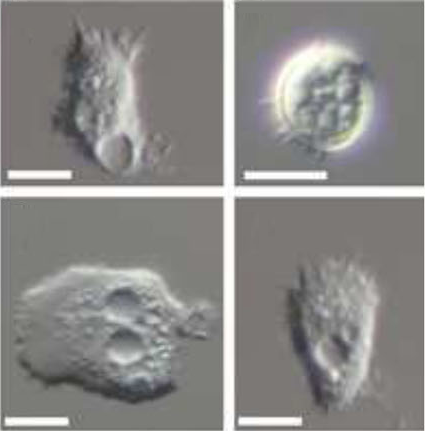
- Trophic cells and cyst (upper right corner)

Scientific classification
- Domain: Eukaryota
- Clade: Amorphea
- Phylum: Amoebozoa
- Class: Discosea
- Order: Centramoebida
- Family: Acanthamoebidae
- Genus: Vacuolamoeba; Tice, Geisen & Brown (2016)
- Species: V. acanthoformis

Binomial name
- Vacuolamoeba acanthoformis Tice, Geisen & Brown (2016)

= Vacuolamoeba =

Genus of naked amoebae

Vacuolamoeba is a monotypic genus of free-living discosean amoebae in the family Acanthamoebidae containing the sole species Vacuolamoeba acanthoformis, discovered, in 2016, at high-altitude soil in Tibet.

== Etymology ==
The generic name Vacuolamoeba references the large size and prominence of the contractile vacuoles. The specific epithet acanthoformis comes from the latin "Acantho", meaning "spine", and references the spiny shape of the pseudopodia produced, as well as the species' resemblance to Acanthamoeba species.

== Morphology ==
Members of Vacuolamoeba are irregular amoebae with diversely shaped pseudopodia and an anterior hyaloplasmic lamellipodium free of cytoplasmic inclusions. Their acanthopodial (tooth-shaped) extensions can form from all areas of the cell body. Occasionally, the cells produce filose uroidal extensions in their locomotive form. The cells mostly have one vesicular nucleus with a central nucleolus, although cells with two nuclei have been observed. The cell body often has around 4 or 5 vacuoles, sometimes with one or more contractile vacuoles. The cysts are between round and irregularly shaped, with a single wall, and usually form individually rather than in clusters.

In particular, V. acanthoformis is often uninucleate with a single round centrally positioned nucleolus. It has a mean cell length or breadth of 22.5 μm, a nucleus with a diameter from 3.2 to 5.5 μm, and a nucleolus with a diameter from 1.1 to 2.2 μm. The cyst diameter is approximately 8.0 μm.
