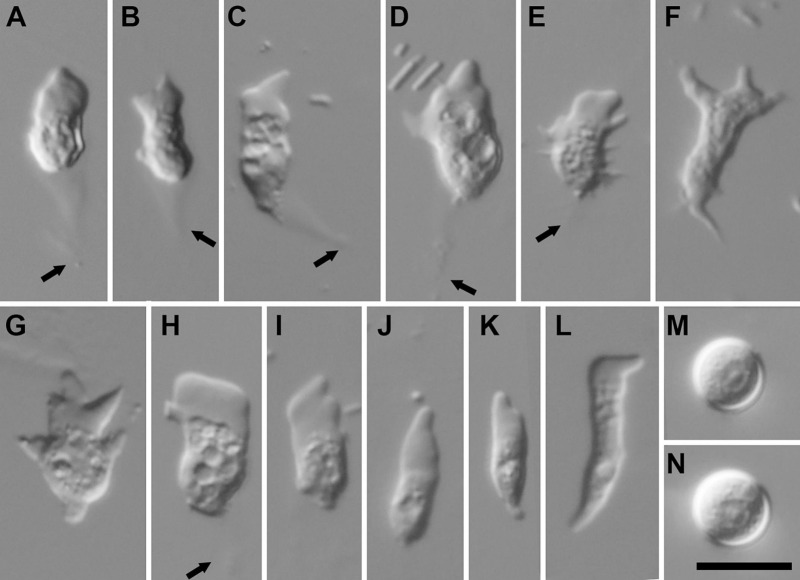
- Light microscopy of Janelia veilia cells

Scientific classification
- Domain: Eukaryota
- Phylum: Amoebozoa
- Class: Discosea
- Order: Mycamoebidae
- Genus: Janelia
- Species: J. veilia

Binomial name
- Janelia veilia

= Janelia veilia =

Species of amoeba

Janelia veilia is a novel amoebozoan protist isolated from a freshwater pond in Janelia Research Campus of Howard Hughes Medical Institute in Ashburn, Virginia, USA. This is the first species in the genus Janelia, and it shares a newly generated order called Mycamoebida with Mycamoeba and Microglomus. The protist has been observed to have several variations pertaining to its pseudopodia, ranging from monopodial limax, conical pseudopodia, to pointed pseudopodia demonstrating the morphological plasticity of the organism. Most notably, the organism has a faint trailing structure referred to as a veil by researchers.

== Ecology ==
J. veilia was first observed from a freshwater pond in Janelia Research Campus of Howard Hughes Medical Institute in Ashburn, Virginia, USA (39°04′17"N 77°27′52"W). Members of the Dermelia clade are typically bacterivores and J. veilia supports this idea. There have been no described accounts of symbiotic relationships for this species.

== Morphology ==
J. veilia has been described to have immense diversity in its morphology. It is most commonly observed in the monopodial limax form with a trailing structure called a veil that is thought to be made up of cellular material. Cells have also been observed to be flat with pointed and conical pseudopodia. On average, cells are 15.2 μm long in locomotion and 5.6 μm wide. A single nucleus is present that is ellipsoid to circular in nature and 3.3 μm in diameter.

== Behavior ==
The most common form of the protist is the monopodial limax form where a single pseudopodium drags the body of the cell along. The other variations in pseudopodia include conical pseudopodia and pointed pseudopodia which may facilitate movement and assist in feeding, although it is not known what stimulates Janelia veilia to change forms. The function of the 'veil' in this organism has yet to be elucidated.

== Taxonomic history ==
The first, and only, description of J. veilia was in 2025, where a novel order named Mycamoebida (sister of Dermamoebida) and a novel subclass named Dermelia were formed. Through sequencing of SSU rRNA and phylogenetic analysis, these designations are supported. Dermelia is known for its diverse morphology and disparity in environmental conditions, with members being found in freshwater, saltwater, and on vegetation.
