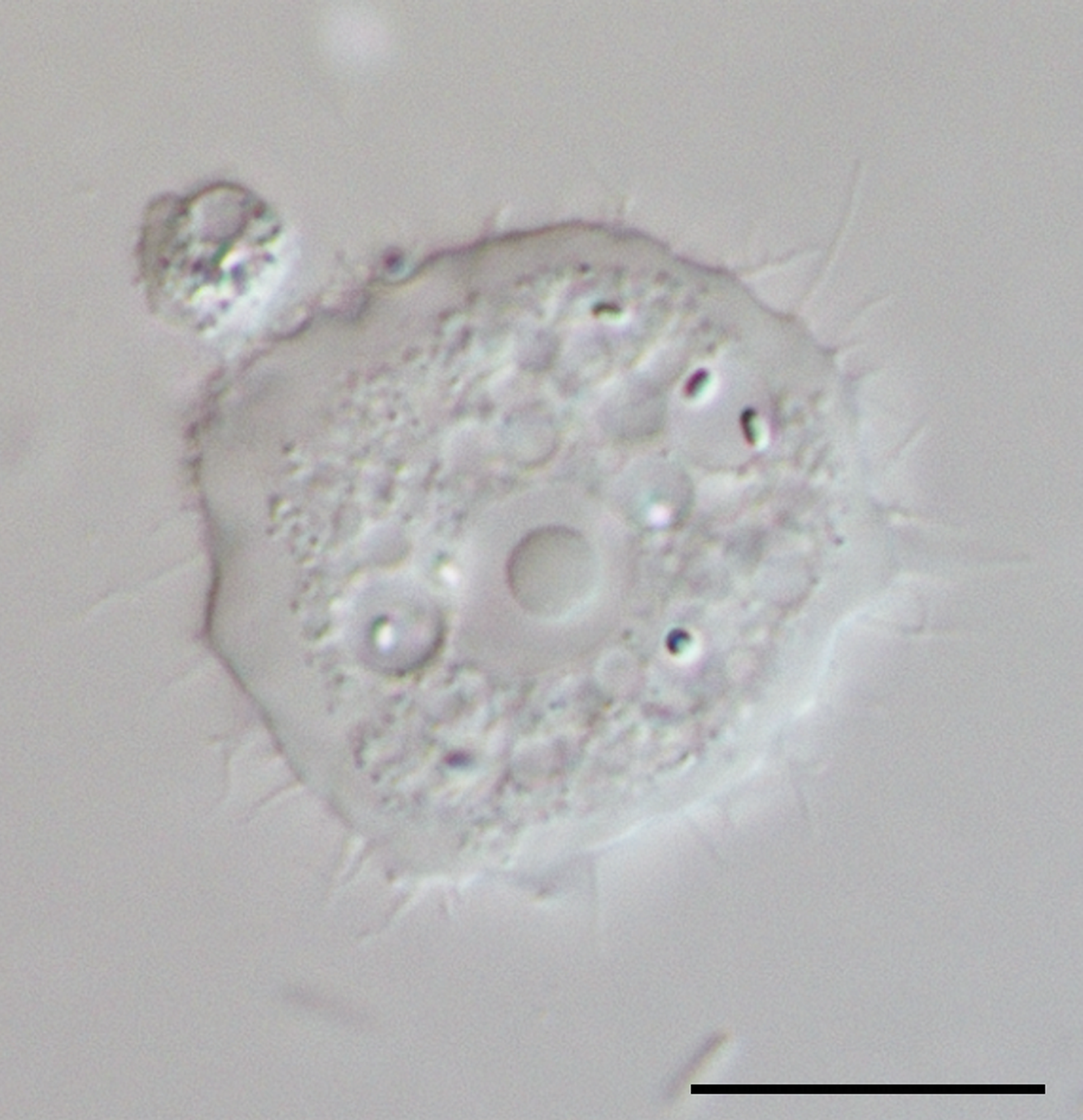
- Acanthamoeba keratitis

Scientific classification
- Domain: Eukaryota
- Phylum: Amoebozoa
- Class: Discosea
- Order: Centramoebida
- Family: Acanthamoebidae

Genera
- Acanthamoeba; Comandonia; Dracoamoeba; Luapeleamoeba; Protacanthamoeba; Vacuolamoeba

= Acanthamoebidae =

Family of protozoans

Acanthamoebidae is a family of single-celled eukaryotes within the group Amoebozoa.

It gets its name from Acanthamoeba, its best-known member. However, it also includes other species, such as Comandonia operculata and Protacanthamoeba bohemica. Many kinds of Acanthamoebidae are highly prevalent in the soil and water of a variety of environments. They are similar to Hartmannella, but have differently structured pseudopodia, in regard to the actin microfilaments that comprise them. Its most prominent member, Acanthamoeba, can be potentially pathogenic to humans and animals.

It has been described as having a common origin with the Entamoebidae and Dictyosteliida.

== Structure ==
Members of Acanthamoebidae have a specific form of pseudopodia, dubbed acanthopodia. These acanthopodia are continuously formed and reabsorbed, protrude from every area of the cell's surface, and are usually, short and fine. An exception would be A. astronyxis and A. comandoni, in which the acanthopodia may be quite long. Sawyer and Griffin point out "[b]undles of actin microfilaments extend as rigid cores into acanthopodia". They are constantly formed and reabsorbed to induce locomotion, during which time the cell is typically triangular or cone-shaped. The advancing acanthopodia are "wide and tongue-shaped, with irregular margins and filopodia." Sawyer and Griffin also note that the many acanthopodia contain axial bundles of the actin microfilaments, resulting in the irregular shape of the pseudopodia. In regards to the typical physical size of the family Acanthamoebidae, they rarely grow larger than 65 μm or are smaller than 30 μm.

== Classification ==
The family Acanthamoebidae belongs to the order Centramoebida in the class Discosea, phylum Amoebozoa. Within the family Acanthamoebidae are the following genera:

- Acanthamoeba – 33 species.
- Comandonia – 1 species.
- Dracoamoeba – 1 species.
- Luapeleamoeba – 2 species.
- Protacanthamoeba – 3 species.
- Vacuolamoeba – 1 species.

== Prevalence ==
Members of Acanthamoebidae are highly prevalent in a variety of environments. In Osaka Prefecture, Japan, members (as well as Naegleria) were found in 68.7% of tapwater samples taken, despite purification. Acanthamoebidae were also found in the St. Martin River near Ocean City, Maryland, and are very common in the surface waters of many oceans.

== Pathology ==
Acanthamoeba spp. can be potentially pathogenic to humans and animals. Typically, a person or animal with a normally functioning immune system can avoid infection, but they "are known to be the opportunistic pathogens in granulomatous amoebic encephalitis (GAE), a chronic disease of immunocompromised hosts such as AIDS patients and transplants recipients." GAE is the result of microscopic cysts that form in the central nervous system. Acanthamoeba can also be the source of infections in the lungs, sinuses, skin, and eyes.
