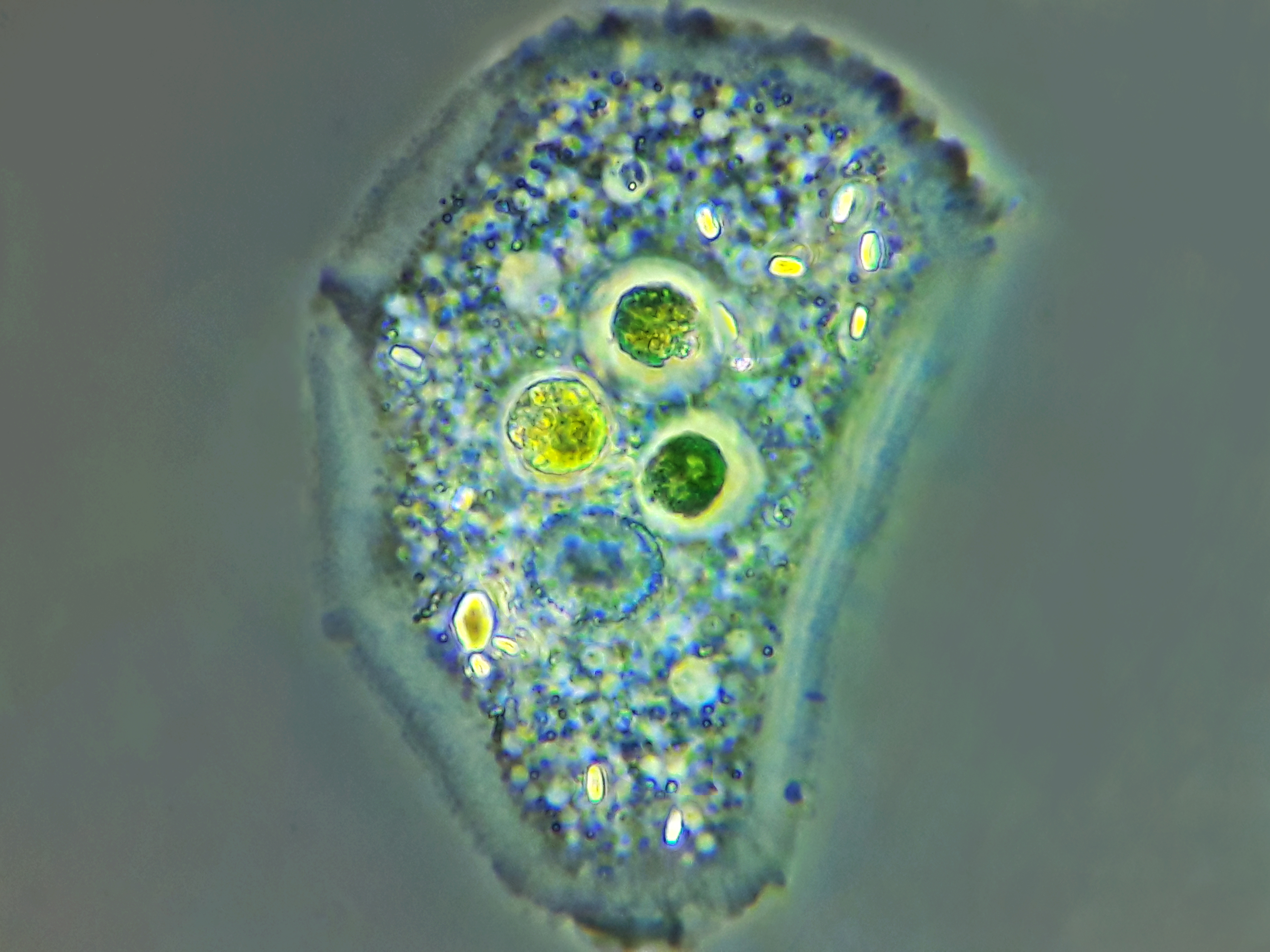
- Amoeba of the genus Cochliopodium. Phase contrast microscopy. In the center, three digestive vacuoles with algae are visible, and a dark cell nucleus is located just below. The cytoplasm contains a lot of light contractile vacuoles, you can notice yellowish crystals.

Scientific classification
- Domain: Eukaryota
- Phylum: Amoebozoa
- Class: Discosea
- Order: Himatismenida
- Family: Cochliopodiidae
- Genus: Cochliopodium; Hertwig & Lesser 1874

Type species
- Cochliopodium pellucidum Hertwig & Lesser 1874

= Cochliopodium =

Genus of protozoans

Cochliopodium is a Himatismenida genus.

It has been found in eyewash stations.

It includes:

- C. actinophorum (Auerbach 1856) Page 1976
- ?C. ambiguum Penard 1904
- C. arabianum Tekle, Gorfu & Anderson 2015
- C. barki Kudryavtsev, Brown et Smirnov 2004
- C. bilimbosum (Auerbach 1856) Leidy 1879
- C. clarum Schaeffer 1926
- ?C. crassiusculum Penard 1905
- ?C. erinaceum Penard 1902
- C. gallicum Kudryavtsev & Smirnov 2006
- C. granulatum Penard 1890
- C. gulosum Schaeffer 1926
- C. kieliense Kudryavtsev 2006
- C. larifeili Kudriavtsev 1999
- C. maeoticum Kudryavtsev 2006
- C. megatetrastylus Anderson & Tekle 2013
- C. minus Page 1976
- C. minutoidum Kudryavtsev 2006
- ?C. minutum West 1901
- ?C. muscorum Wang 1977
- ?C. obscurum Pen.
- ?C. papyrum Bovee 1958
- C. pentatrifurcatum Tekle et al. 2013
- C. plurinucleolum Geisen et al. 2014
- ?C. radiosum Biernacka 1963
- ?C. silvaticum Varga 1935
- C. spiniferum Kudryavtsev 2004
- ?C. spumosum Penard 1904
- C. vestitum (Archer 1871) Archer 1877

== Recombination and meiosis ==
The Cochliopodium genome includes genes whose functions are employed in the process of genetic recombination suggesting the possibility of a sexual stage. The genome sequence of Cochliopodium minus contains a complete set of genes necessary for meiosis a key stage of sexual reproduction.
