= Platyamoeba =

Scientific classification
- Domain: Eukaryota
- Clade: Amorphea
- Phylum: Amoebozoa
- Class: Discosea
- Order: Vannellida
- Family: Vannellidae
- Genus: Platyamoeba; Page, 1969

Type species
- Platyamoeba placida Page, 1969

Genus of amoebae

Platyamoeba is a genus of Amoebozoa.
