= Vannellidae =

Scientific classification
- Domain: Eukaryota
- Clade: Amorphea
- Phylum: Amoebozoa
- Class: Discosea
- Subclass: Flabellinia
- Order: Vannellida; Smirnov et al., 2005
- Family: Vannellidae; Bovee, 1970

Genera
- Clydonella; Discamoeba; Lingulamoeba; Paravannella; Pessonella; Platyamoeba; Protosteliopsis; Ripella; ?Unda; Vannella

Family of protozoans

The Vannellidae are a family of Amoebozoa, which are found in soil, fresh- and salt water. The most common genus is Vannella.

== Description ==
Vannellidae tend to be flattened and fan-shaped during motion, although some are long and narrow, and have a prominent clear margin at the anterior. In most amoebae, the endoplasm glides forward through the center of the cell, but vannellids undergo a sort of rolling motion with the outer membrane sliding around like a tank tread. These amoebae are usually 10-40 μm in size, but some are smaller or larger.

Vannellidae are surrounded by an outer covering called the glycocalyx, which is generally 10-20 nm across, though the thickness varies among species. In some species, a layer of hair-like filaments called glycostyles protrudes from the glycocalyx.

Vannella simplex full mitochondrial genome sequence shows significant difference from its close relative Neoparamoeba pemaquidensis. Similarities are limited to family or genera levels with too much diversity to see commonalities amongst clades beyond the genera level.

== Parasitism ==
Currently, there is an investigation into Vanellidae focused on parasitization. Vanellidae can be found within the gills of freshwater rainbow trouts. These infections pose significant problems for farming rainbow trouts. Current treatments being investigated include chemical and some vegetable compounds. As of 2020, these findings are still being worked on in vitro with hopes of doing in vivo experiments to alleviate the issues.

While not directly pathogenic to humans, free living amoebas, such as Vannellidae, can be the host of pathogenic microorganisms. Due to their ability to transmit other pathogens, clinical identification is encouraged.

== Taxonomy ==
Issues in classification for Vannellidae arise from the genus classification level. Morphological data being used for classification has found conflict with genetic information. Genetic sequencing of multiple vannellid amoebas has shown a mix of morphological characteristics. As of 2007, there were 40 species Vannellidae identified through genetic sequencing. Molecular phylogenies include Vannellidae in the class Flabellinia as a sister group to the others, which have subpseudopodia. In 2007, the taxonomy of Vannella expanded to include Platyamoeba. Previously, Vannella was separated based on the presence of glycostyles in the cell surface. Through genetic verification, Vanella and Platyamoeba are shown to not be genetically distinct.
