= Echinamoebidae =

Scientific classification
- Domain: Eukaryota
- Phylum: Amoebozoa
- Class: Tubulinea
- Order: Echinamoebida
- Family: Echinamoebidae; Page, 1975

Family of protozoans

Echinamoebidae is a family of Amoebozoa, containing the genera Echinamoeba and Comandonia. It was established by Frederick Page in 1975.

== Taxonomy ==
Family Echinamoebidae Page 1975

- Genus Comandonia Sawyer & Griffin 1975 ex Pernin & Pussard 1979
  - Species C. operculata Sawyer & Griffin 1975 ex Pernin & Pussard 1979
- Genus Micriamoeba Atlan et al. 2012
  - Species M. tesseris Atlan et al. 2012
- Genus Echinamoeba Page 1975
  - Species E. exudans (Page 1967) Page 1975
  - Species E. silvestris Page 1975
  - Species E. thermarum Baumgartner et al. 2003
