= Unda (protist) =

Scientific classification
- Domain: Eukaryota
- Phylum: Amoebozoa
- Class: Discosea
- Order: Vannellida
- Family: Vannellidae
- Genus: Unda Schaeffer 1926

Type species
- Unda maris Schaeffer 1926

Species
- U. maris Schaeffer 1926; U. schaefferi Sawyer 1975

Genus of protozoans

Unda is a genus of Amoebozoa.
