= Intracellular bacteria =

Bacteria that can enter and survive in host cells

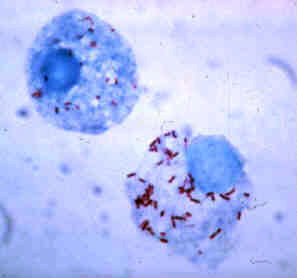
Rickettsia rickettsii (stained red) within tick haemolymph cells.

Intracellular bacteria are bacteria that have the capability to enter and survive within the cells of the host organism. These bacteria include many different pathogens that live in the cytoplasm and nuclei of the host cell's they inhabit. Mycobacterium tuberculosis is an example of an intracellular bacterial species. There are two types of intracellular bacteria: facultative intracellular bacteria, which can grow extracellularly or intracellularly, and obligate intracellular bacteria, which can grow only intracellularly.

== Facultative intracellular bacteria ==
Examples of facultative intracellular bacteria include members of the genera Brucella, Legionella, Listeria, and Mycobacterium. These bacteria invade the human body and replicate inside the cells, evading the immune system and causing disease by disrupting the human's cells normal function. Diseases caused by facultative intracellular bacteria include Listeriosis (Listeria monocytogenes), Typhoid Fever (Salmonella typhi), Legionnaires' disease (Legionella pneumophila), and Salmonellosis (Salmonella enterica) to name a few. While they can invade the human body, they are also capable of living extracellularly. These bacteria can replicate within the environment, sustain their metabolic state, and survive harsh conditions by using mechanisms such as a bacterium-containing vacuole, lysosome resistance, and entering a survival state called persistence.

== Obligate intracellular bacteria ==
Examples of obligate intracellular bacteria include members of the orders Rickettsiales and Chlamydiales and members of the genus Mycoplasma. These bacteria need the human host to be able to reproduce and when they have invaded the body, they cause disease. Unlike facultative intracellular bacteria that can grow within or outside of a host's body, obligate bacteria cannot survive without host cells. These bacteria cannot reproduce outside of the host cell because they lack the metabolic processes and enzymes needed to reproduce, which the host cell gives them. Diseases caused by obligate intracellular bacteria include chlamydia (Chlamydia trachomatis) and Rocky Mountain Spotted Fever (Rickettsia rickettsii).

== Infectious pathways ==
Hosts usually come into contact with the bacteria through the skin, but there are chances of contracting the bacteria from a bite, such as that of ticks, mites, and/or mosquitoes (Rickettsia rickettsii). Listeria monocytogenes is found in soil, water, and also decaying animals and plants. It is generally transmitted through food being processed or handled in areas contaminated with L. monocytogenes. Legionella pneumoniae are found in aquatic conditions, such as artificial water systems, like that of hot tubs and showers. Salmonella typhi and Salmonella enterica are both transmitted orally through feces or through food and/or water that has the bacteria. Chlamydia trachomatis is spread by having unprotected sex. Mycobacterium tuberculosis is spread through the air when being near anyone with tuberculosis.

== See also ==
- Endosymbiont
