= Comandonia =

Scientific classification
- Domain: Eukaryota
- Phylum: Amoebozoa
- Class: Tubulinea
- Order: Echinamoebida
- Family: Echinamoebidae
- Genus: Comandonia; Sawyer & Griffin 1975
- Species: C. operculata

Binomial name
- Comandonia operculata Sawyer & Griffin 1975 ex Pernin & Pussard 1979

Genus of protozoans

Comandonia is a genus of Amoebozoa in the family Echinamoebidae.
