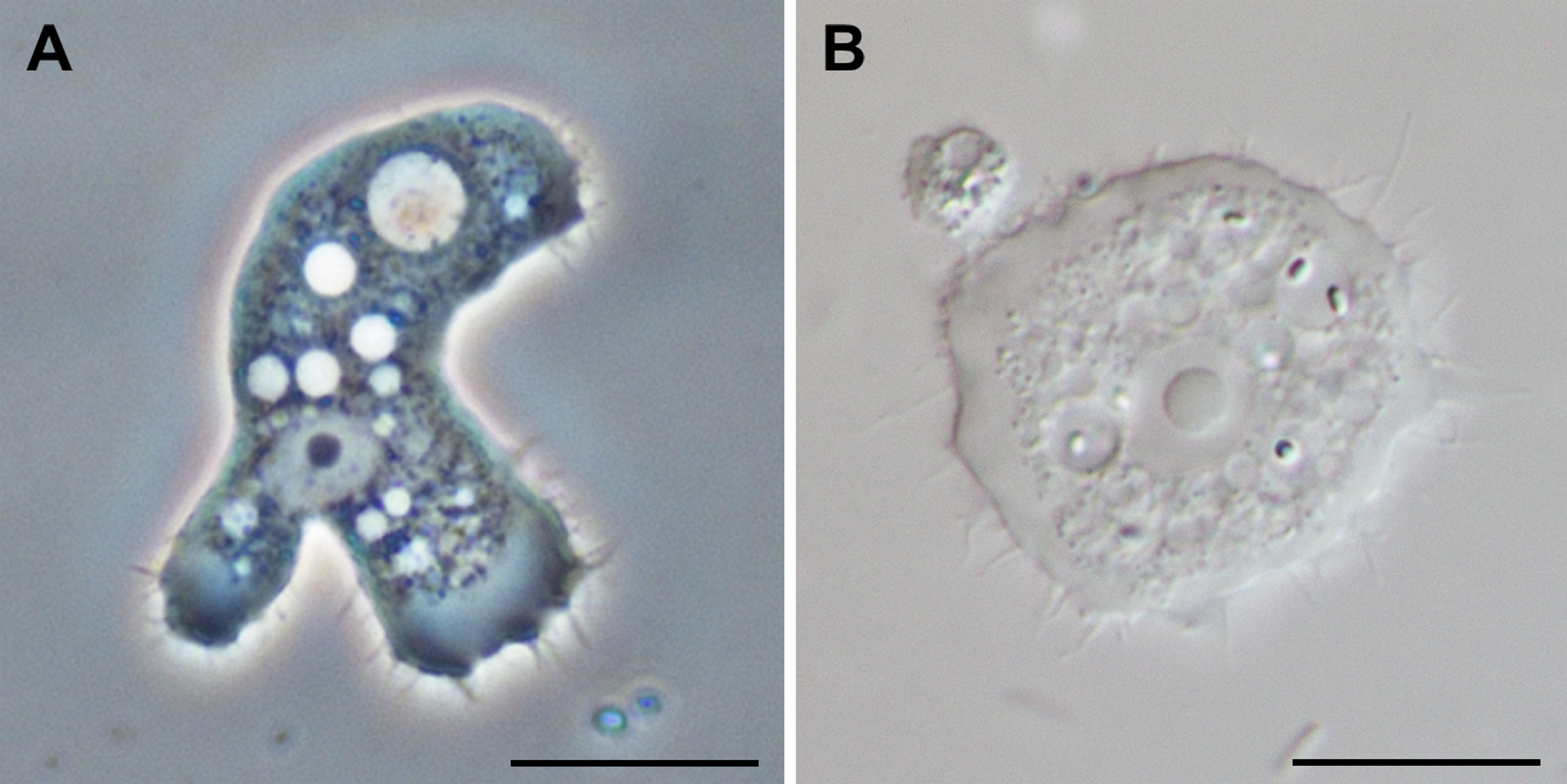
- Acanthamoeba sp.

Scientific classification
- Domain: Eukaryota
- Phylum: Amoebozoa
- Class: Discosea
- Subclass: Flabellinia; Smirnov et al. 2005

Orders
- Dactylopodida; Dermamoebida; Stygamoebida; Vannellida

= Flabellinia =

Subclass of Amoebozoa

The Flabellinia are a subclass of Amoebozoa. During locomotion the cells are flattened and have a clear layer called hyaloplasm along the front margin. Some form slender subpseudopodia projecting outward from the hyaloplasm, but the cell mass does not flow into these as in true pseudopodia, and advances without a definite central axis as in the Tubulinea. They also lack distinctive features like shells and flagella, and are united mainly by evidence from molecular trees.

The group was originally created by Alexey Smirnov and his coauthors as the class Flabellinea, which was similar in composition to the group Discosea, proposed by Cavalier-Smith et al. (2004). In 2011, Smirnov accepted Discosea as a class and reduced Flabellinea to the rank of a subclass, with the name Flabellinia.
