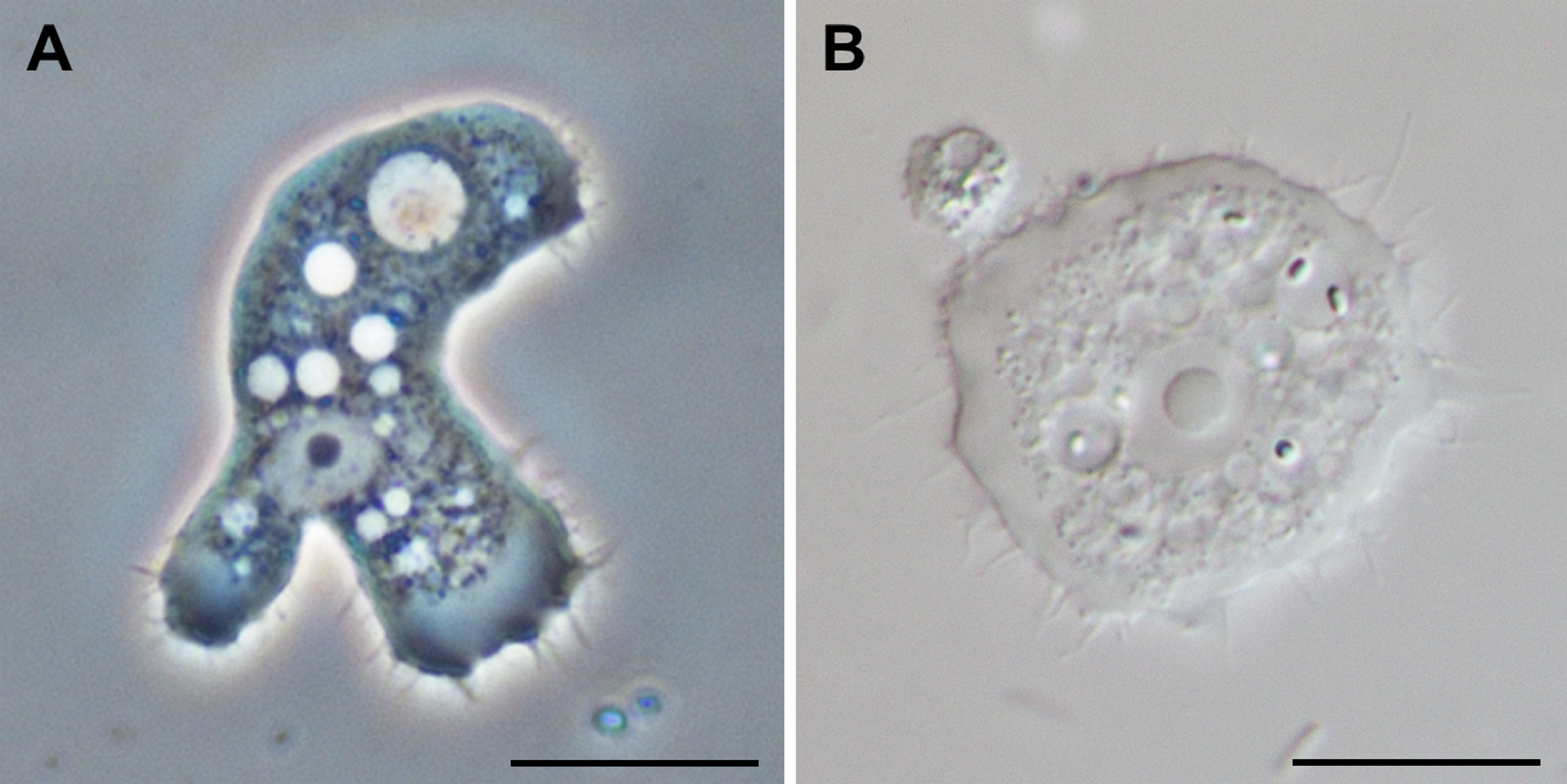
- Acanthamoeba sp.

Scientific classification
- Domain: Eukaryota
- Phylum: Amoebozoa
- Subphylum: Lobosa
- Class: Discosea; Cavalier-Smith et al. 2004

Subclasses and orders
- Order ?Hyalodiscida; Order ?Stereomyxida; Order ?Stygamoebida; Subclass Centramoebia; Order Centramoebida; Order Himatismenida; Order Pellitida; Subclass Flabellinia; Order Dactylopodida; Order Dermamoebida; Order Thecamoebida; Order Vannellida

= Discosea =

Class of amoebae

Discosea is a class of Amoebozoa, consisting of naked amoebae with a flattened, discoid body shape. Members of the group do not produce tubular or subcylindrical pseudopodia, like amoebae of the class Tubulinea. When a discosean is in motion, a transparent layer called hyaloplasm forms at the leading edge of the cell (see lamellipodium). In some discoseans, short "subpseudopodia" may be extended from this hyaloplasm, but the granular contents of the cell do not flow into these, as in true pseudopodia. Discosean amoebae lack hard shells, but some, like Cochliopodium and Korotnevella secrete intricate organic scales which may cover the upper (dorsal) surface of the cell. No species have flagella or flagellated stages of life.

The composition of Discosea is similar to that of the class Flabellinea, proposed by Alexey Smirnov and his collaborators in 2005. However, Discosea is a more comprehensive taxon, including several groups not included in Flabellinea. In 2011, Smirnov et al. accepted Discosea as a class, and reduced Flabellinea to the rank of a subclass with the name Flabellinia.

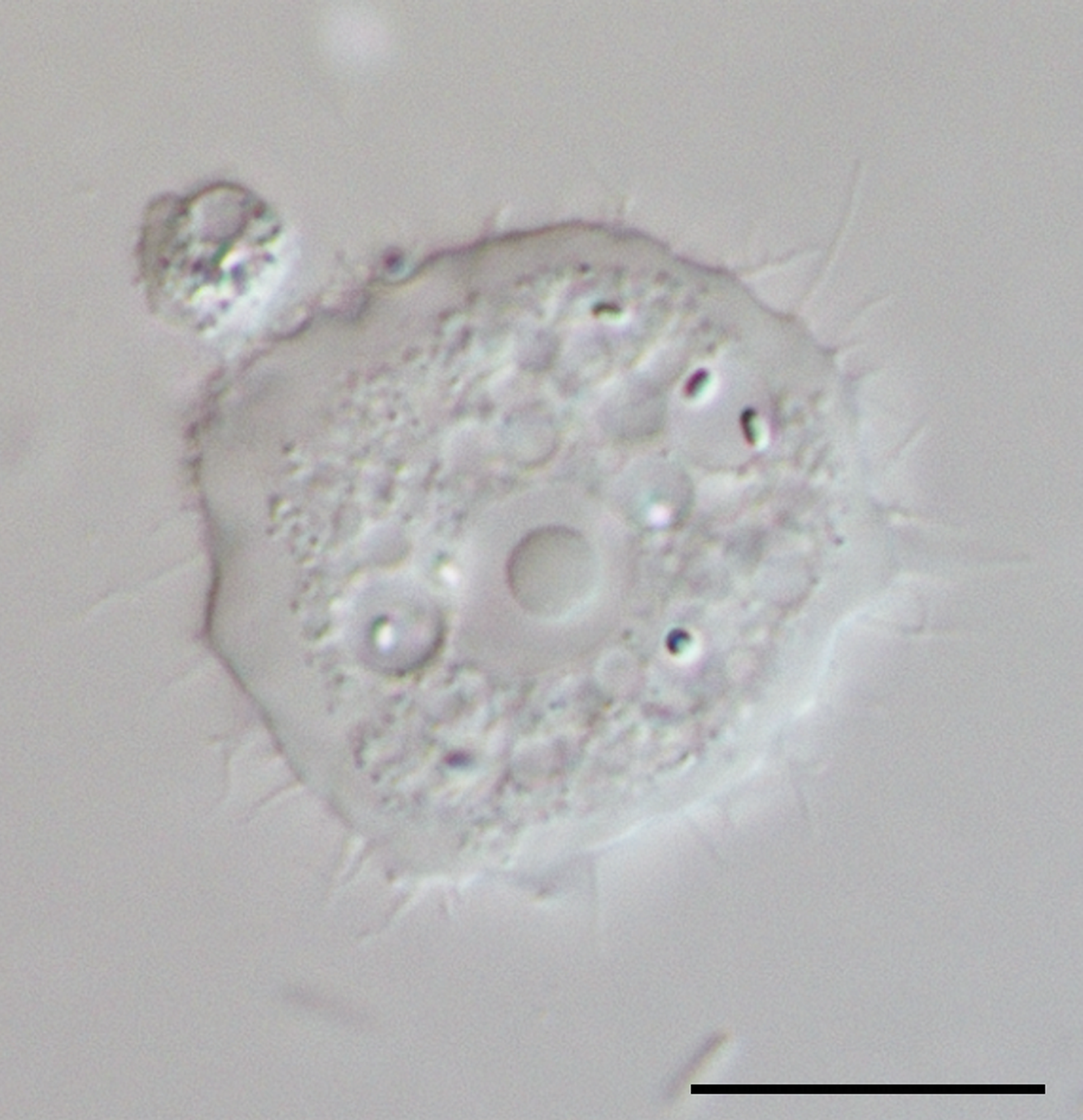
Acanthamoeba sp.

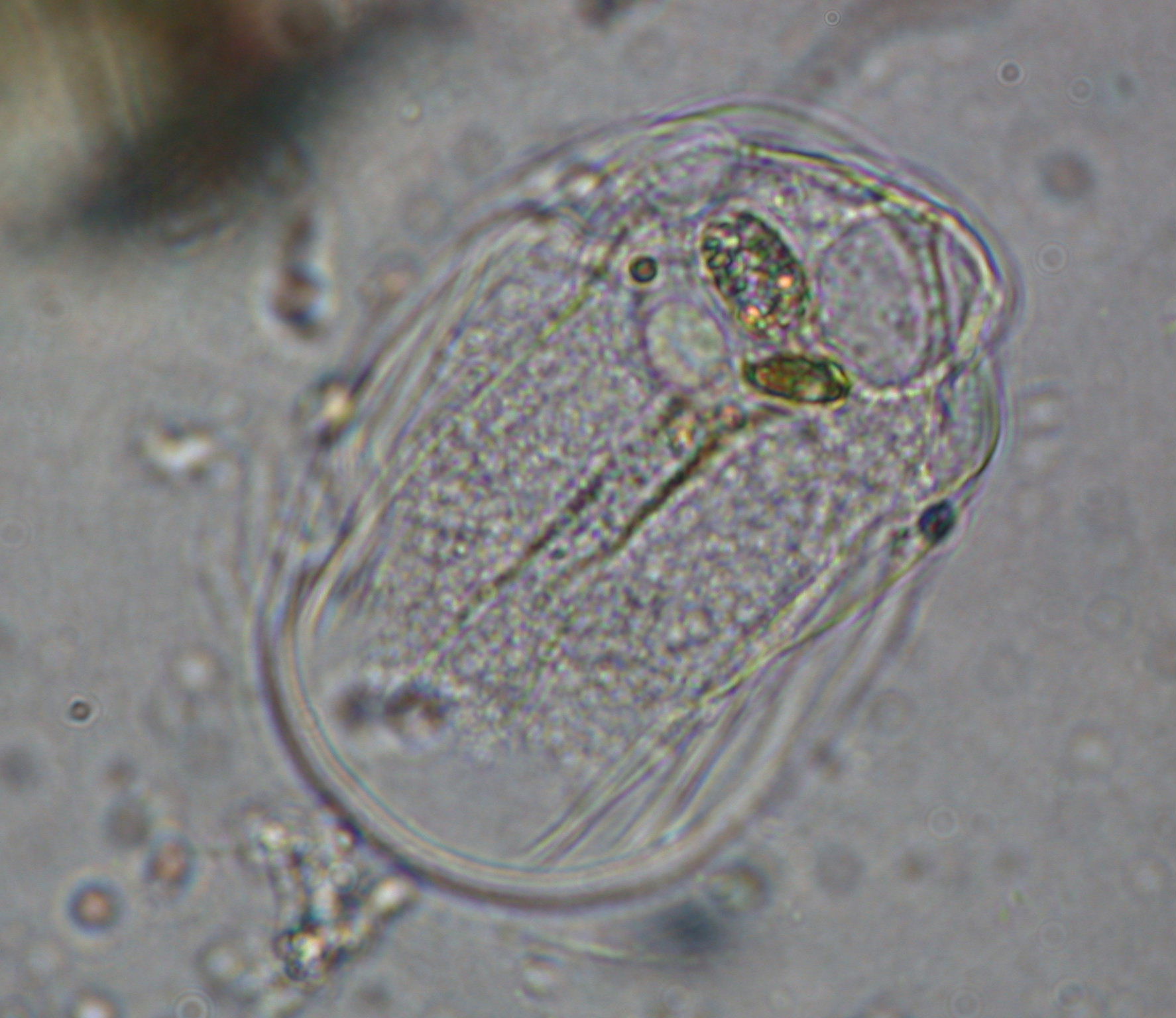
Thecamoeba sp.

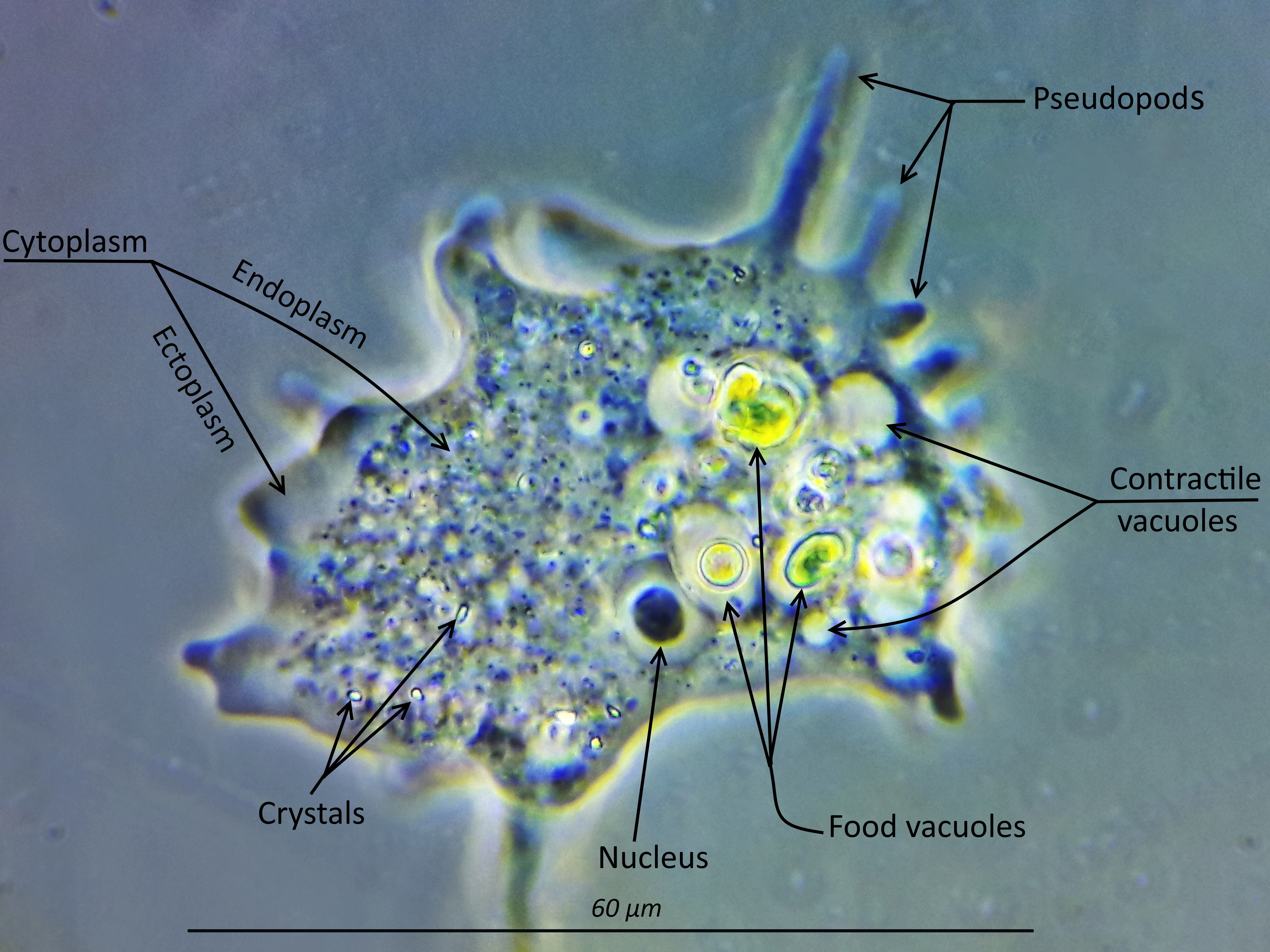
Mayorella (Amoebozoa, Discosea)

== Taxonomy ==
Class Discosea Cavalier-Smith 2004 stat. nov. Adl et al. 2018

- Order ?Hyalodiscida
  - Family Hyalodiscidae Page 1976 non Poche 1913
- Order ?Stereomyxida Grell 1971
  - Family Stereomyxidae Grell 1966
- Order ?Stygamoebida Smirnov & Cavalier-Smith 2011
  - Family Stygamoebidae Cavalier-Smith & Smirnov 2011
- Subclass Centramoebia Cavalier-Smith et al. 2016
  - Order Centramoebida Rogerson & Patterson 2002 em. Cavalier-Smith 2004
    - Family Balamuthiidae Cavalier-Smith 2004
    - Family Acanthamoebidae Sawyer & Griffin 1975 em. Tice et al. 2016
  - Order Himatismenida Page 1987 [Cochliopodiida]
    - Family Parvamoebidae Cavalier-Smith & Smirnov 2011
    - Family Cochliopodiidae Taranek 1882
  - Order Pellitida Page 1987
    - Family Pellitidae Smirnov & Kudryavtsev 2005
    - Family Goceviidae Cavalier-Smith & Smirnov 2011
- Subclass Flabellinia Smirnov & Cavalier-Smith 2011 em. Kudryavtsev et al. 2014
  - Order Dactylopodida Smirnov et al. 2005
    - Family Paramoebidae Poche 1913 em. Kudryavtsev, Pawlowski & Hausmann 2011
    - Family Vexilliferidae Page 1987 em. Kudryavtsev, Pawlowski & Hausmann 2011
  - Order Dermamoebida Cavalier-Smith 2004 em. Smirnov & Cavalier-Smith 2011
    - Family Dermamoebidae Cavalier-Smith & Smirnov 2011 (Lingulate amoeba)
    - Family Mayorellidae Schaeffer 1926 em. Smirnov et al. 2011
  - Order Thecamoebida Schaeffer 1926 em. Smirnov & Cavalier-Smith 2011
    - Family Stenamoebidae Cavalier-Smith 2016
    - Family Thecamoebidae Chatton 1925 em. Smirnov et al. 2011 (striate & rugose amoeba)
  - Order Vannellida Smirnov et al. 2005
    - Family Discamoebidae Bovee & Jahn, 1967 ex Jahn, Bovee & Griffith 1974
    - Family Vannellidae (Bovee, 1970)
