= Soliformovum =

Scientific classification
- Domain: Eukaryota
- Phylum: Amoebozoa
- Class: Variosea
- Order: Protosteliida
- Family: Protosteliidae
- Genus: Soliformovum; Spiegel, 1994

Genus of amoebas

Soliformovum is a genus of amoebas. They are protosteloid amoebae that develop long-stalked fruiting bodies.

Two species are assigned to this genus:

- Soliformovum irregulare (L.S.Olive & Stoian.) Spiegel, 1994
- Soliformovum expulsum (L.S.Olive & Stoian.) Spiegel, 1994

Both species were previously classified within the genus Protostelium.
