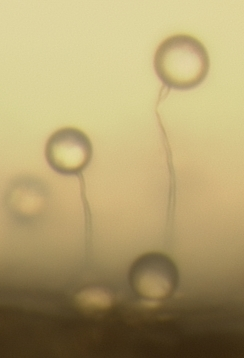
- Protosteloid development in Protostelium mycophaga

Scientific classification (polyphyletic)
- Phylum: Amoebozoa
- Class: Mycetozoa
- Subclass: Protostelia (Note: The name can vary depending on the taxonomic rank used. Used names include Protostelea, Protostelia, and Protostelida.) Olive 1970

Orders
- Protosteliida; Protosporangiida (=Ceratiomyxales); Cavosteliida; Schizoplasmodiida; Fractoviteliida; Vannellida (in part); Centramoebida (in part); Pellitida (in part); Echinosteliida (in part)

Diversity
- Around 40 species

= Protosteloid =

Protosteloid amoebae

Artificial group of slime moulds

The protosteloid amoebae, or protosteloids (formerly known as protostelids), are a group of terrestrial amoebae capable of developing a tiny fruiting body or sporocarp consisting of a stalk supporting one or more spores. They do not form a natural group; instead, they have gained the sporocarp-forming ability independently from each other during evolution.

== Description ==
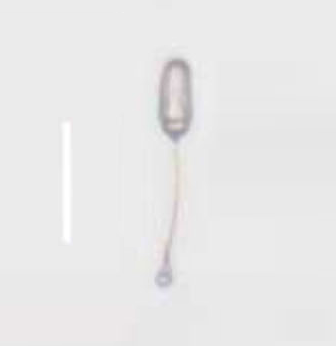
Protosteloid phase of Luapeleamoeba (Centramoebida)

Protosteloid amoebae are capable of making simple fruiting bodies consisting of a cellular stalk topped by one or a few spores. These are known as sporocarps. All species are microscopic and are typically found on dead plant matter where they consume bacteria, yeasts, and fungal spores. Since protostelids are amoebae that make spores, they are considered to be slime molds.

Protosteloid amoebae are terrestrial, typically found on dead plant matter, including stems and leaves of herbaceous plants, stems and leaves of grasses, bark of living trees, decaying wood and other types of dead plant matter. Some species are aquatic; they live on dead plant parts submerged in a pond. Others live on the petals of living flowers and on living tree leaves. Since protosteloid amoebae eat bacteria, yeasts, and fungal spores in the laboratory, it is thought that they also do this in nature. They are thus thought to be predators in decomposer communities.

== Diversity ==
Occurrence of protosteloid behavior in Amoebozoa

- - Tubulinea
  - - Discosea
      - Centramoebia
        - Himatismenida
        - - Pellitida*
          - Centramoebida*
      - Flabellinia
        - Dermamoebida*
        - - - Vannellida*
            - Dactylopodida
          - Thecamoebida, Stygamoebida
    - Evosea
      - Cutosea
      - Conosa
        - Archamoebae
        - Variosea
          - Protosteliida**
          - Cavosteliida*
          - Fractoviteliida*
          - Schizoplasmodiida**
          - other varioseans
        - Eumycetozoa
          - Dictyostelia
          - - Protosporangiida**
            - Myxogastria
              - Lucisporinia
              - Columellinia
                - Echinosteliida*
                - Stemonitidia

*Group with at least two protosteloid species. **Group entirely composed of protosteloid species. Amoebozoa tree based on a 2022 phylogenomic analysis, Myxogastria tree according to the latest (2019) classification.

Protosteloid development has evolved numerous times in different clades of Amoebozoa, a major clade of mostly amoeboid eukaryotes. Three of the major groups of amoebozoans, Discosea, Variosea and Eumycetozoa, have at least some protosteloid members, with Variosea being the more abundant in protosteloids. They are entirely absent in Tubulinea, the fourth major group.

Within Variosea, Cavosteliida is the largest protosteloid group, containing four genera: Cavostelium, Nannostelium, Schizoplasmodiopsis and Tychosporium. Another group is Protosteliida, containing the genus Protostelium, the first protosteloid organism to be discovered. In Eumycetozoa are the protosteloid genera Protosporangium, Ceratiomyxa and Clastostelium within Protosporangiida, and Echinostelium and Echinosteliopsis within Myxogastria.

Within Discosea, several orders contain amoebae that have evolved protosteloid development: the genus Luapeleamoeba and the species Acanthamoeba pyriformis in the order Centramoebida; the genus Endostelium in the order Pellitida; the genus Protosteliopsis in the order Vannellida; and the genus Microglomus in the order Dermamoebida.

== Distribution ==
Collections of protosteloids have been made from all continents, including the Antarctic peninsula. Protosteloids have also been found on isolated islands like Hawaii in the Pacific and Ascension Island in the southern Atlantic, indicating that protosteloids have a worldwide distribution. Most studies of protosteloid distribution have been done in the temperate zones so they are best known from these areas. However, tropical studies have turned up protosteloids, often in great abundance.

== Collection and laboratory culture ==
Since protosteloid amoebae are microscopic one must bring their substrates, dead plant matter, into the laboratory to find them. Dead plant matter is placed on the agar surface in a petri plate and allowed to incubate for several days to a week. Then the edges of the substrates are scanned with a compound microscope and species are identified by their fruiting body morphology and amoebal morphology.

When protosteloid fruiting bodies are found they can be moved into laboratory culture onto an appropriate food organism or mix of organisms. This is done by picking up fruiting bodies or spores with a sterilised needle and moving them onto agar in a fresh petri plate that has been smeared with a bacterium or yeast upon which the protosteloid amoeba species has been known to grow. If the spores germinate then the protostelid begins eating the food organism and a culture is established.

== See also ==
- Soliformovum irregulare
