= Soliformovum irregulare =

Scientific classification
- Domain: Eukaryota
- Phylum: Amoebozoa
- Class: Variosea
- Order: Protosteliida
- Family: Protosteliidae
- Genus: Soliformovum
- Species: S. irregulare

Binomial name
- Soliformovum irregulare (L.S.Olive & Stoian.) Spiegel, 1994

Synonyms
- Soliformovum irregularis (L.S.Olive & Stoian.) Spiegel, 1994; Protostelium irregularis L.S.Olive & Stoian., 1969

Species of amoeba

Soliformovum irregulare is a species of protosteloid amoeba notable for its widespread presence in grassland and forest ecosystems, where it commonly inhabits the aerial portions of dead plant material. Originally classified under the genus Protostelium, it was later reassigned to Soliformovum due to significant morphological differences observed under light and electron microscopy. S. irregulare is characterized by flabellate, fan-shaped amoebae, distinctive long-stalked fruiting bodies, and uninucleate spores. The species thrives in moist environments and is frequently encountered in laboratory cultures containing yeast or bacteria, making it one of the most commonly studied protosteloid amoebae.

== Morphology ==
Soliformovum irregulare typically appears flabellate (fan-shaped) during migration, a trophic state in which the organism consists of uninucleate amoebae. Its nucleus contains multiple nucleoli, often lobed and dispersed, and is surrounded by vesicles. The amoebae contain numerous small contractile and food vacuoles, and their mitochondria have tubular cristae.The species forms long-stalked fruiting bodies with single, uninucleate, deciduous spores. Its lamellipodial front contains pointed subpseudopodia that may elongate in highly moist environments. Pseudopodial crawling is the organism's primary mode of motility. Microtubules, which vary in length, are dispersed throughout the cytoplasm without originating from a central point.

== Behavior ==
Soliformovum irregulare is distinguished by its large sporocarps and fan-shaped migrating amoebae. The species grows and sporulates well in cultures with various yeasts and bacteria. Amoebae tend to taper posteriorly and may display refractile granules in tail-like projections. In water, they extend numerous filose pseudopodia. Plurinucleate and multinucleate protoplasts are common and likely result from both cell fusions and mitosis without cytokinesis.In culture, the amoebae may migrate into agar media, becoming highly irregular in shape, and producing irregular cysts. The steliogen, involved in stalk development, is hemispherical and hyaloplasmic, contributing to tub formation. If a sporocarp falls onto an agar surface, it reverts to the trophic state.

== Ecology ==
Soliformovum irregulare appears to be more abundant in grasslands, with preferred microhabitats including both grasslands and forests. It is more common in aerial grassland microhabitats than in those of forests. The species is frequently encountered when aerial dead plants are kept in moist chambers and is considered one of the most common and widespread protosteloid amoebae.

== Taxonomic history ==
Soliformovum irregulare was first described by L.S. Olive and Stoianovitch as Protostelium irregularis. Further study revealed significant morphological differences from other Protostelium species, particularly P. mycophaga, prompting its reassignment to the genus Soliformovum. The species epithet was later corrected following the International Code of Nomenclature for algae, fungi, and plants (ICN).
