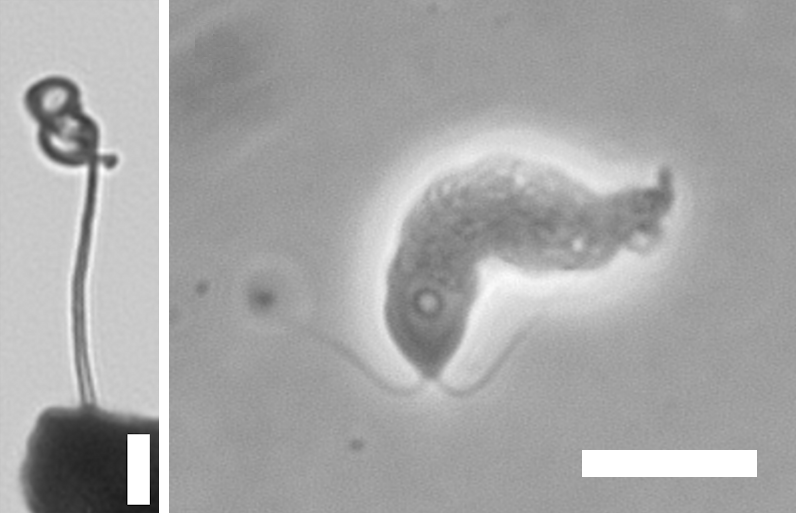
- Protosporangium articulatum fruiting body (left) and amoeboflagellate (right)

Scientific classification
- Domain: Eukaryota
- Phylum: Amoebozoa
- Class: Ceratiomyxomycetes
- Order: Ceratiomyxales
- Family: Protosporangiidae
- Genus: Protosporangium; L.S. Olive & Stoianovitch 1972

= Protosporangium =

Genus of amoebae

Protosporangium is a genus of amoebae capable of growing microscopic fruiting bodies, known as protosteloid sporocarps.

== Description ==
Protosporangium is a genus of protosteloid amoebae, meaning they develop fruiting bodies (sporocarps) consisting of an individual stalk that supports one or more spores. Sporocarps of Protosporangium are slender and hollow, supported by a circular disc, and bearing one, two, four or eight spores. Each spore has smooth walls and a single nucleus, and germinates by meiosis into cells with one or two anterior flagella. These develop into the trophic stage, consisting of amoeboflagellates with filose (thread-like) pseudopodia and multiple nuclei. Each amoeba later segments itself into smaller pre-spore cells that generate the sporocarps.

Most species of this genus have relatively tall fruiting bodies, usually exceeding 200 micrometres in height. They are most commonly found growing on tree bark and wood. The most commonly encountered species is Protosporangium articulatum.

== Taxonomy ==
The genus Protosporangium was described by Lindsay S. Olive and Carmen Stoianovitch in 1972, along with three species: P. fragile, P. articulatum, and P. bisporum, which became the type species. Later, Walter E. Bennett described P. conicum in 1986.

Initially, Protosporangium was placed under the order Protosteliida, which at the time included all protosteloid amoebae. However, a 2009 molecular phylogenetic analysis revealed the polyphyly of this taxon: the different groups of protosteloid amoebae had evolved independently the ability to form similar fruiting bodies, and were otherwise unrelated. Protosporangium was found to be closely related to the genus Clastostelium. The two genera were joined in one family, Protosporangiidae (under zoological nomenclature) or Protosporangiaceae (under botanical nomenclature), under the order Protosporangiida (also known as Ceratiomyxales), which also includes the genus Ceratiomyxa.
