= Endostelium zonatum =

Scientific classification
- Domain: Eukaryota
- Phylum: Amoebozoa
- Class: Protosteliomycetes
- Order: Protosteliales
- Family: Protosteliaceae
- Genus: Endostelium
- Species: E. zonatum

Binomial name
- Endostelium zonatum (L.S.Olive & Stoian.) W.E.Benn. & L.S.Olive, 1984

Species of amoeba

Endostelium zonatum (originally named Protostelium zonatum) is a species of protosteloid amoeba classified within the phylum Discosea. This organism is recognized as a protostelid, which consists of individual ameboid cells that can multiply and migrate, sometimes forming clumps, but it does not undergo aggregation into multicellular structures as seen in true cellular slime molds. Initially classified under the genus Protostelium in 1969, it was later reclassified into Endostelium based on molecular phylogenetic studies.

Characterized by its distinctive amoeboid form and unique fruiting bodies, E. zonatum reproduces asexually through regular cell division, and sporulation an additional asexual process that occurs during its life cycle. It thrives in moist environments rich in decaying organic matter and plays a vital role in nutrient cycling within its ecosystem. Although there are limited biogeographic studies on this species, E. zonatum exhibits a preference for aerial environments and has been found in southwestern Europe.

E. zonatum is typically small, with its central plug and fruiting body structures ranging from about 30 nm to 180 nm in diameter. Proportions generally align with the typical sizes observed in protostelids with their individual cells generally falling within a similar nanoscale range.

== Ecology ==
Endostelium zonatum is typically found in moist environments rich in decaying organic matter, such as decomposing plant materials and leaf litter. As both a decomposer and grazer, it plays a vital role in nutrient cycling by consuming bacteria and, in turn, being consumed by larger organisms like nematodes. This organism is integral to the decomposition process of forest ecosystems, breaking down biotic substances and facilitating the transfer of nutrients back into the surrounding soil.

This species demonstrates a selective occurrence in aerial litter environments, indicating a preference for this substrate type. Its reproductive strategy includes effective sporulation on diverse substrates, such as pollen grains and agar media, which showcases its adaptability to various ecological conditions.

The distribution of E. zonatum in southwestern Europe marks a significant contribution to the knowledge of protostelids, since this species had not been previously recorded in the region. Additionally, it offers insights into dictyostelid evolution, as it is considered a potential ancestor to the primitive cellular slime mold Acytostelium.

== Morphology ==
Endostelium zonatum exhibits a distinctive amoeboid form characterized by a flexible, shapeshifting body capable of extending pseudopodia for movement and feeding. It typically consists of large, primarily uninucleate amoeboid cells, although some may be plurinucleate. These cells are often circular and feature distinct contractile vacuoles along with filose pseudopodia, essential for locomotion and nutrient acquisition.

Ultrastructural studies reveal specialized features, including a double unit membrane of the nuclear envelope and distinctive mitochondria with irregular cristae. Within the nucleus, two morphologically distinct types of intranuclear inclusions are present. One type consists of coiled tubular structures that, in cross-section, appear as cisternae and oval to elliptical vesicles measuring 40-60 nm in diameter. These tubular and vesicular structures are formed by a unit membrane directly connected to the inner nuclear membrane. The second type of inclusion is a membrane-bound structure containing amorphous and/or fibrous material, typically located at several sites within the nucleus, with no similar structures found in the cytoplasm. The cytoplasm itself contains diverse vesicles, some with smooth or ribosome-coated membranes, as well as lipid bodies with amorphous, electron-opaque contents.

Microfibers, measuring 6 nm in diameter, play a crucial role in maintaining cell structure and mobility, being abundant and organized into bundles. The fruiting body structure consists of a central plug surrounded by an electron-dense ring, with the plug protruding 50-100 nm from one end of the ring and measuring 50-70 nm in diameter at its widest. The ring has a diameter of approximately 180 nm and is about 40 nm thick, featuring a zonate stalk (distinct bands or zones along its length) and a single spore at the tip, with small sporocarps well-adapted for efficient spore dispersal. These small sporocarps develop within rising sporogen and are typically subglobose to somewhat depressed-globose, usually surrounded by a sheath represented by a line of cytoplasmic particles.

The cysts produced by E. zonatum are generally globose and uninucleate that provide a means of survival in unfavorable conditions. This species is particularly noted for its chain-like stalk and pyriform (pear-shaped) spore, which serve as key identifiers. Although specific measurements are not detailed, its morphology suggests a relatively small size typical of protostelids, requiring careful examination under a microscope for observation.

Recent findings regarding the two types of intranuclear inclusions suggest potential novel features in the ultrastructure of protostelids. Given the absence of similar intranuclear structures in previous studies of myxomycetes, this enhances overall understanding of its morphology and evolutionary prominence. Furthermore, the presence of microfibers, common in both protostelids and dictyostelids, links E. zonatum to features noted in myxomycete plasmodia and differentiating cellular slime molds.

== Behavior ==
Like other amoebozoans, E. zonatum primarily moves through pseudopodial projection and cytoplasmic streaming, enabling it to navigate its environment and effectively prey on bacteria. During migration, these projections create visible tracks over the substrate as the organism extends its cytoplasm. It feeds on bacteria and other microorganisms through phagocytosis, engulfing neighboring food particles. After feeding, the cells reproduce asexually through cell division, with sporulation being an asexual process that occurs when the cells differentiate into prespore cells. During this process, microscopic fruiting bodies (normally bearing a single spore atop a delicate stalk) are formed and subsequent spore dispersal and germination can occur under favorable conditions.

Cell division occurs through constriction at the midpoint of the cell, akin to processes seen in related species like Vannella fimicola. Although E. zonatum was identified during field studies, successful cultivation in laboratory conditions may pose challenges, as culturing protostelids has proven difficult due to their specific environmental requirements and high sensitivity to changes in controlled conditions.

== Taxonomic history ==
Recognized for its distinct morphology and reproductive structures, Endostelium zonatum was initially described as part of the genus Protostelium by Olive and Stoianovitch in 1969. This classification reflected an early understanding of its ecological characteristics within the broader context of mycetozoans. Various studies, including morphological assessments and molecular analyses, have contributed to the understanding of its taxonomy and clarified its relationships with other amoebozoans.

In 1984, based on these morphological characteristics, Olive reclassified E. zonatum into the genus Endostelium, strengthening support for this species' placement. However, a more accurate depiction of its evolutionary relationships within the amoebozoan clade was made through advances in molecular phylogenetics, which further prompted its reclassification.
