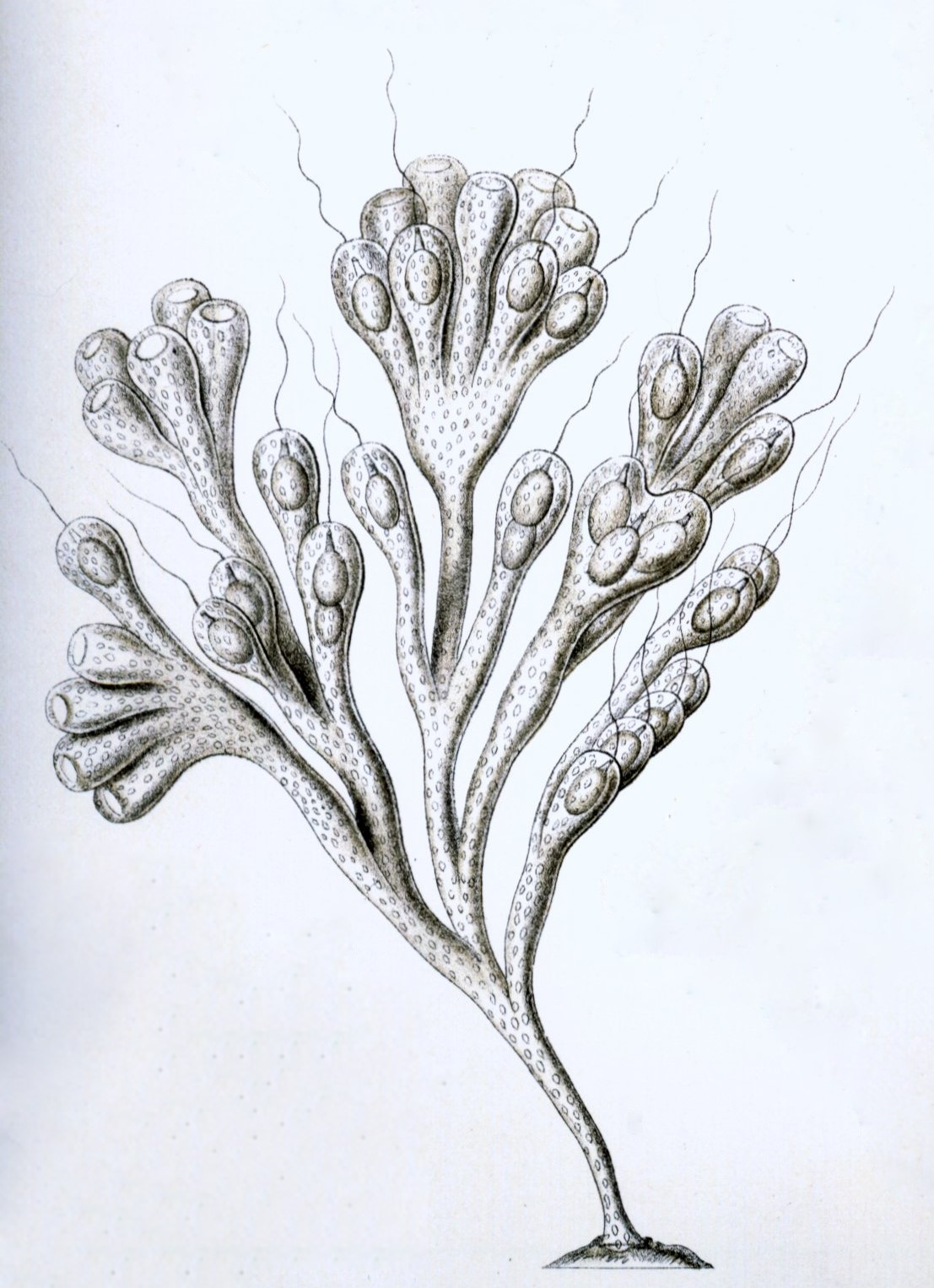
- Phalansterium digitatum

Scientific classification
- Domain: Eukaryota
- Phylum: Amoebozoa
- Class: Variosea
- Order: Phalansteriida
- Family: Phalansteriidae; W.S.Kent, 1881
- Genus: Phalansterium; Cienkowski, 1870

= Phalansterium =

Genus of single-celled organisms

Phalansterium is a genus of single-celled flagellated organisms comprising several species, which form colonies. It is the only genus in the family Phalansteriidae. Phalansterium produces tetraspores.

Phalansterium is hard to classify; it has a distinctive ultrastructure of its pericentriolar material. Molecular evidence places it in the Amoebozoa.

It has been suggested that it is similar to the ancestral eukaryote.

== Species ==
Genus Phalansterium Cienkowsky 1870

- Species Phalansterium arcticum Shmakova, Karpov & Smirnov 2018
- Species Phalansterium consociatum (Fresenius 1858) Cienkowsky 1870
- Species Phalansterium digitatum Stein 1878
- Species Phalansterium filosum Cavalier-Smith & Chao 2011
- Species Phalansterium intestinum Cienkowsky 1870
- Species Phalansterium solitarium Sandon 1924
