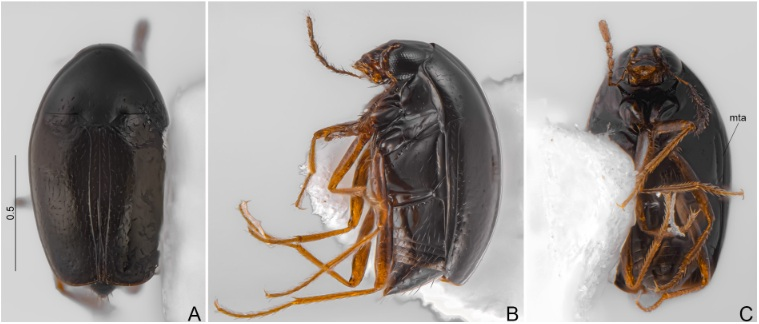

Scientific classification
- Domain: Eukaryota
- Kingdom: Animalia
- Phylum: Arthropoda
- Class: Insecta
- Order: Coleoptera
- Suborder: Polyphaga
- Infraorder: Staphyliniformia
- Family: Staphylinidae
- Genus: Baeocera
- Species: B. facilis

Binomial name
- Baeocera facilis von Groll, 2025

= Baeocera facilis =

Species of beetle

Baeocera facilis is a species of beetle in the family Staphylinidae. This species is found in south-eastern Brazil (Minas Gerais).

Adults reach a length of about 1–1.18 mm and have a brown to dark brown body.

Adults have been collected from Ceratiomyxa fruticulosa on a fallen Pinus tree.

== Etymology ==
The species epithet is a Latin word meaning ‘easy’ and refers to the simplicity of distinguishing this species from others.
