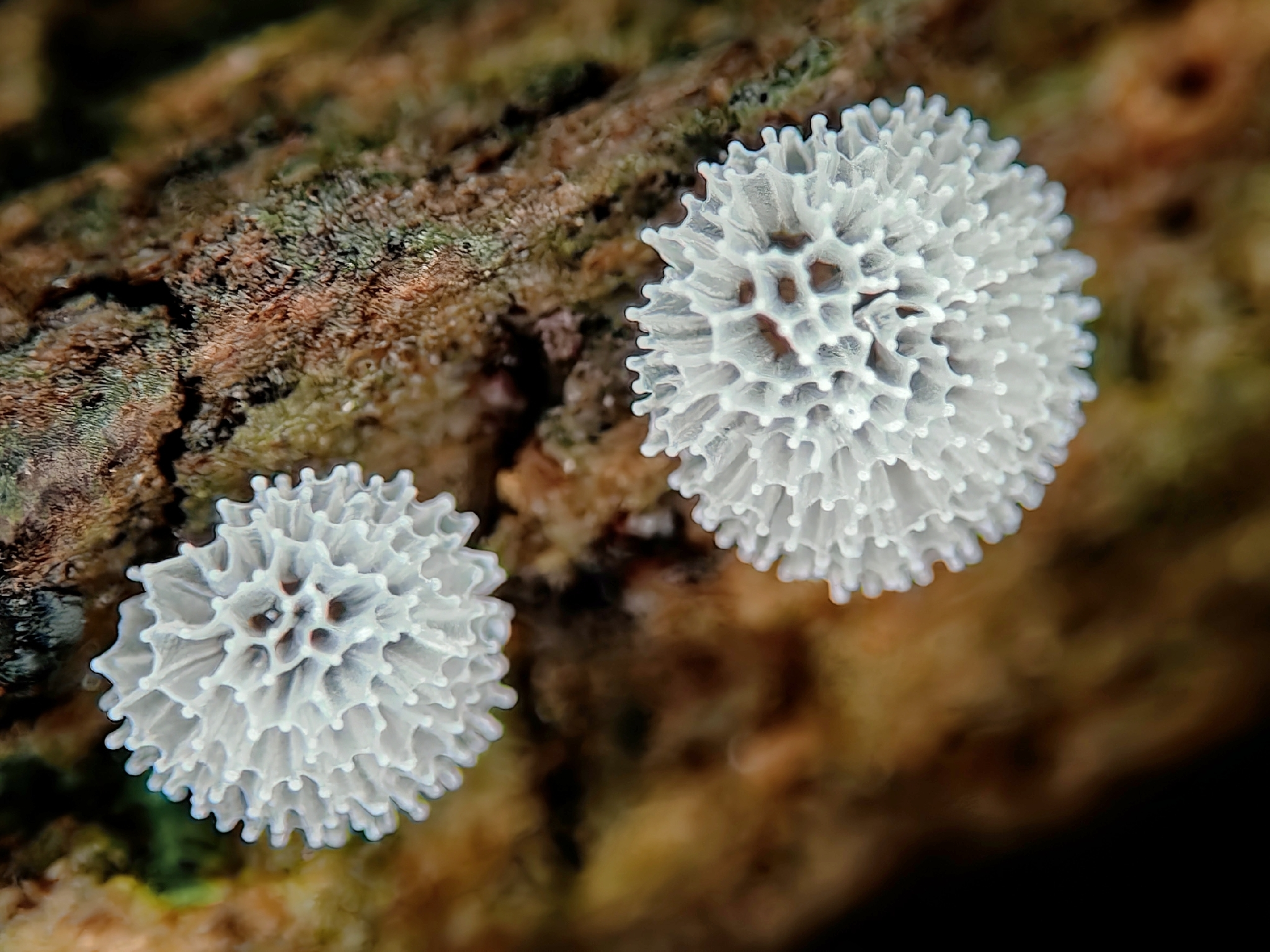

Scientific classification
- Domain: Eukaryota
- Supergroup: Amorphea
- Phylum: Amoebozoa
- Class: Ceratiomyxomycetes
- Order: Ceratiomyxales
- Family: Ceratiomyxaceae
- Genus: Ceratiomyxa
- Species: C. porioides

Binomial name
- Ceratiomyxa porioides (Alb. & Schwein.) J.Schröt., 1889

= Ceratiomyxa porioides =

Species of slime mold

Ceratiomyxa porioides, also known as the honeycomb coral slime mold, is a common species of slime mold in the Mycetozoa group. Long considered a morphological variant of Ceratiomyxa fruticulosa, C. poriodes was described as a separate species in 2024 based on transcriptomes. C. fruticulosa has historically been considered a widespread cosmopolitan species.
