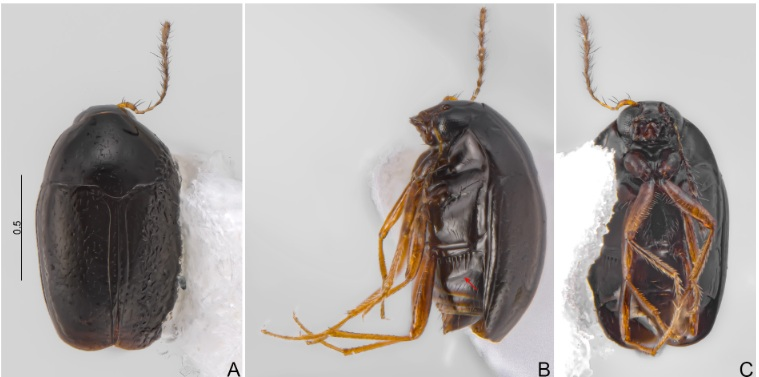

Scientific classification
- Domain: Eukaryota
- Kingdom: Animalia
- Phylum: Arthropoda
- Class: Insecta
- Order: Coleoptera
- Suborder: Polyphaga
- Infraorder: Staphyliniformia
- Family: Staphylinidae
- Genus: Baeocera
- Species: B. inusitata

Binomial name
- Baeocera inusitata von Groll, 2025

= Baeocera inusitata =

Species of beetle

Baeocera inusitata is a species of beetle in the family Staphylinidae. This species is found in south-eastern Brazil (Minas Gerais).

Adults reach a length of about 1.09–1.31 mm and have a dark brown body.

Adults have been collected from Ceratiomyxa fruticulosa on a fallen Pinus tree and other two logs, also covered with C. fruticulosa.

== Etymology ==
The species epithet is a Latin word meaning ‘unusual’, referring to the distinctive morphology of the female ovipositor.
