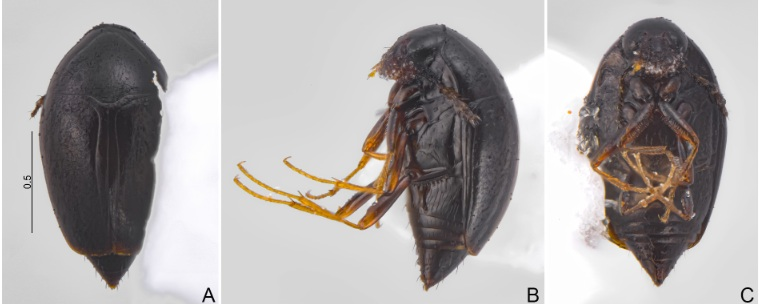

Scientific classification
- Domain: Eukaryota
- Kingdom: Animalia
- Phylum: Arthropoda
- Class: Insecta
- Order: Coleoptera
- Suborder: Polyphaga
- Infraorder: Staphyliniformia
- Family: Staphylinidae
- Genus: Baeocera
- Species: B. bottine

Binomial name
- Baeocera bottine von Groll, 2025

= Baeocera bottine =

Species of beetle

Baeocera bottine is a species of beetle of the Staphylinidae family. This species is found in south-eastern Brazil (Minas Gerais).

Adults reach a length of about 1.16–1.22 mm and have a dark brown body.

Adults have been collected from Ceratiomyxa fruticulosa on a fallen Pinus tree.

== Etymology ==
The species epithet is a French noun in apposition, meaning ‘boot’, in allusion to the female ovipositor’s resemblance to Victorian ladies’ boots.
