= Planoprotostelium aurantium =

Scientific classification
- Domain: Eukaryota
- Clade: Amorphea
- Phylum: Amoebozoa
- Class: Variosea
- Order: Protosteliida
- Family: Protosteliidae
- Genus: Planoprotostelium
- Species: P. aurantium

Binomial name
- Planoprotostelium aurantium Olive & Stioanovitch, 1971

Species of protist

Planoprotostelium aurantium is a mycetozoan species.
