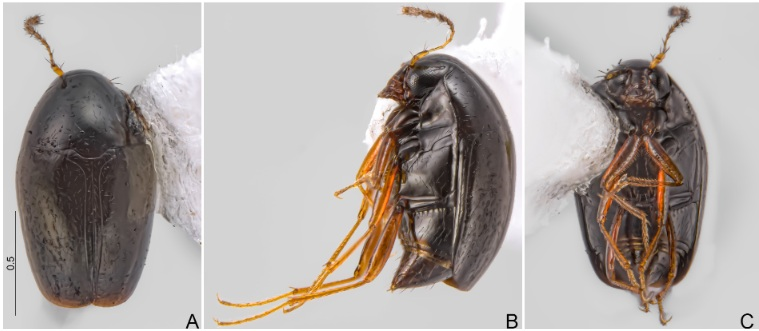

Scientific classification
- Domain: Eukaryota
- Kingdom: Animalia
- Phylum: Arthropoda
- Class: Insecta
- Order: Coleoptera
- Suborder: Polyphaga
- Infraorder: Staphyliniformia
- Family: Staphylinidae
- Genus: Baeocera
- Species: B. ardua

Binomial name
- Baeocera ardua von Groll, 2025

= Baeocera ardua =

Species of beetle

Baeocera ardua is a species of beetle in the family Staphylinidae. This species is found in south-eastern Brazil (Minas Gerais).

Adults reach a length of about 1.11 mm and have a dark brown body.

Adults have been collected from Ceratiomyxa fruticulosa on a fallen Pinus tree.

== Etymology ==
The species epithet is a Portuguese adjective in apposition, meaning ‘difficult’, ‘hard’, referring to the challenging study of this morphologically uniform group, and in particular this species.
