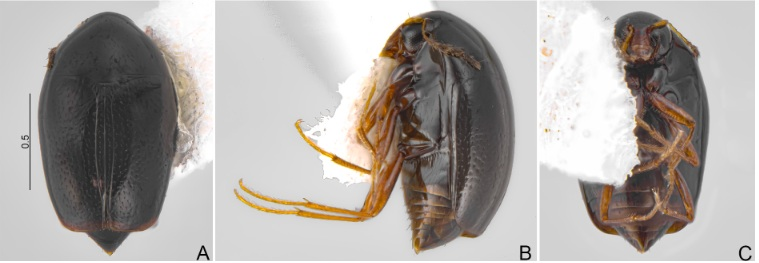

Scientific classification
- Domain: Eukaryota
- Kingdom: Animalia
- Phylum: Arthropoda
- Class: Insecta
- Order: Coleoptera
- Suborder: Polyphaga
- Infraorder: Staphyliniformia
- Family: Staphylinidae
- Genus: Baeocera
- Species: B. colibri

Binomial name
- Baeocera colibri von Groll, 2025

= Baeocera colibri =

Species of beetle

Baeocera colibri is a species of beetle in the family Staphylinidae. This species is found in south-eastern Brazil (Minas Gerais).

Adults reach a length of about 1.08–1.22 mm and have a dark brown body.

Adults have been collected from Ceratiomyxa fruticulosa on a fallen Pinus tree, Xylodon flaviporus and from unknown fungi on logs.

== Etymology ==
The species epithet is a Spanish noun in apposition, meaning ‘hummingbird’, alluding to the hummingbird-like male sclerite of the internal sac.
