= Protostelium okumukumu =

Scientific classification
- Domain: Eukaryota
- Phylum: Amoebozoa
- Class: Variosea
- Order: Protosteliida
- Family: Protosteliidae
- Genus: Protostelium
- Species: P. okumukumu

Binomial name
- Protostelium okumukumu Spiegel, Shadwick & Hemmes 2006

Species of slime mould

Protostelium okumukumu is a species of Protostelium found in Hawaii and New Zealand.

== See also ==
- Protosteliales
