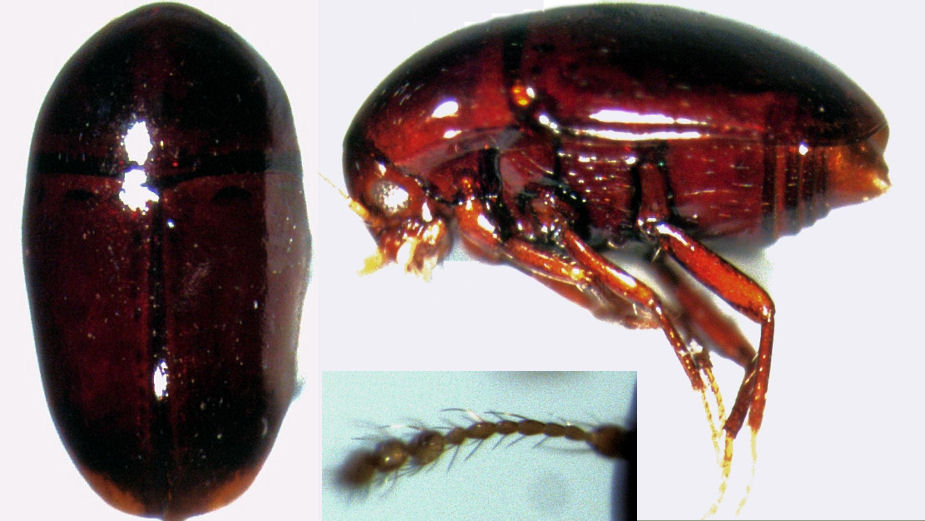
- Baeocera tenuis

Scientific classification
- Kingdom: Animalia
- Phylum: Arthropoda
- Class: Insecta
- Order: Coleoptera
- Suborder: Polyphaga
- Infraorder: Staphyliniformia
- Family: Staphylinidae
- Subfamily: Scaphidiinae
- Genus: Baeocera; Erichson, 1845

Synonyms
- Sciatrophes Blackburn, 1903; Cyparella Achard, 1924; Amaloceroschema Löbl, 1967; Eubaeocera Cornell, 1967

= Baeocera =

Genus of beetles

Baeocera is a genus of beetles belonging to the family Staphylinidae. It is one of the largest genera in the subfamily Scaphidiinae, with over 300 species, which can be found on all continents.

== Selected species ==
- Baeocera ardua von Groll, 2025
- Baeocera bottine von Groll, 2025
- Baeocera colibri von Groll, 2025
- Baeocera facilis von Groll, 2025
- Baeocera freudei Löbl, 1967
- Baeocera inusitata von Groll, 2025
- Baeocera pulga von Groll, 2025
