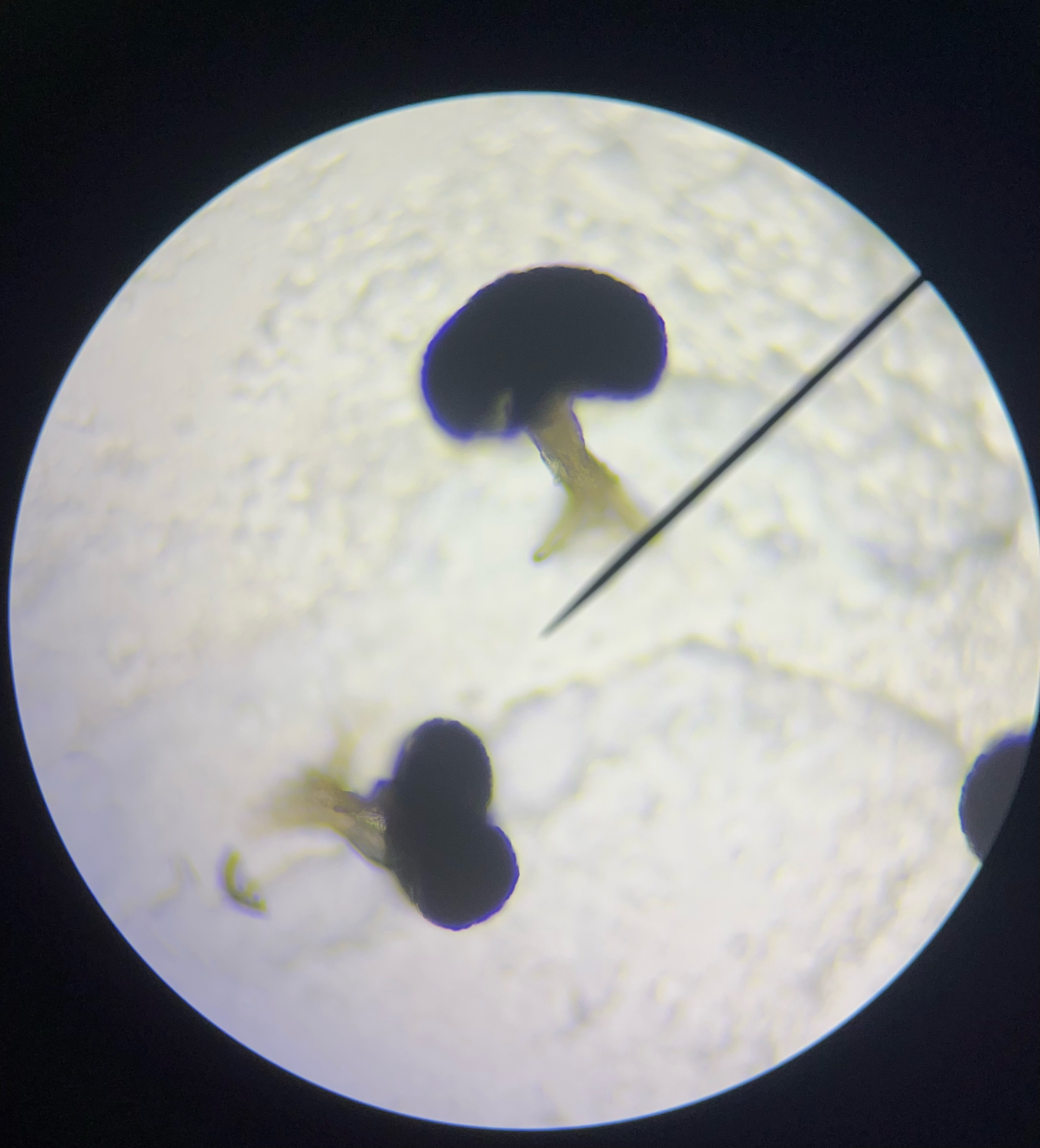

Scientific classification
- Domain: Eukaryota
- Phylum: Amoebozoa
- Class: Protosteliomycetes
- Order: Protosteliales
- Family: Protosteliaceae
- Genus: Protosteliopsis
- Species: P. fimicola

Binomial name
- Protosteliopsis fimicola (L.S.Olive) L.S. Olive & Stoian.

= Protosteliopsis fimicola =

Species of amoeba

Protosteliopsis fimicola is an amoeba that forms a fruiting body that consists of a single spore with a non-cellular stalk. This species was thought to be closely related to the species P. mycophya, but it was found that it has a significant difference from this species because of having an irregular stalk and non-deciduous spores. Later it was found that Protosteliopsis is a part of group 6 in the genus Vannella based on 18s rRNA molecular phylogenetics.

== Taxonomy ==
Vannella fimicola is a part of the class Discosea in the group Amoebozoa. In 2009 when J. Shadwick came to the conclusion that Protosteliopsis are considered Vannella instead which is a sister species to Vannella placida. Vanella fimicola is within the genus Vanella in group 6 through molecular phylogenetics of 18s rRNA gene.

== Ecology ==
Can be found in warm climates such as Arizona, Hawaii, etc. This species can be found in cow dung, decaying fruits, and soil. It feeds on bacteria, conidial fungi, and in some cases yeast in laboratories.

== Morphology ==
Vannella fimicola are fan-shaped and round ended. Cam not foorm pseudopodia or sub pseudopodia. The organism has a wide anterior and hyaloplasm is up half of the cell and the posterior granuloplasm raised over their substratum. This species is known for their fruiting body morphologies. This species has a broader base and a long wide stalk which appears to be jelly like or waterlogged. It also contains a single non deciduous, uninucleate spore.

== Behavior ==
Vanella fimicola are uninucleate amoeba that develop fruting bodies called a sporocarp from a singular deciduous spore. The life cycle of this organism starts off as a trophic cell and becomes one or more prespore cell. It then rises to the top of the stalk during the culminating sporogen stage.

== Taxonomic history ==
Protostelium mycophaga was the first amoeba of protostelids to be described and established as the genus Protostelium. At first Protosteliumincluded all organisms that were uninucleate amoeba that make fruiting bodies which later added 7 more species to this genus. But because of characteristics such as fruiting body development, amoeba morphology, and gene sequences, some species have been removed from the genus. Protostelium fimicola was moved to the genus and was renamed Vanella fimicola.
