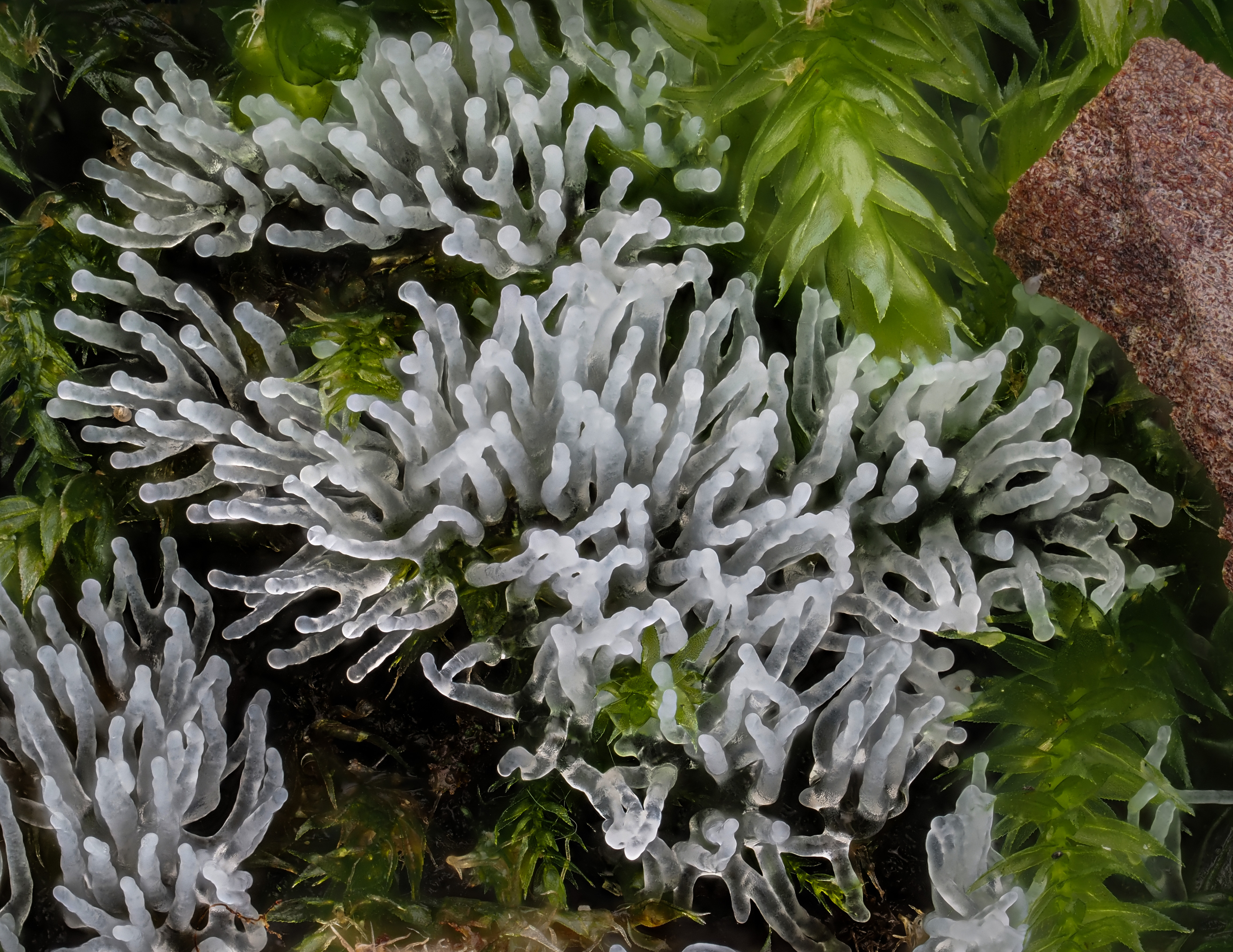
- Ceratiomyxa fruticulosa fruiting bodies
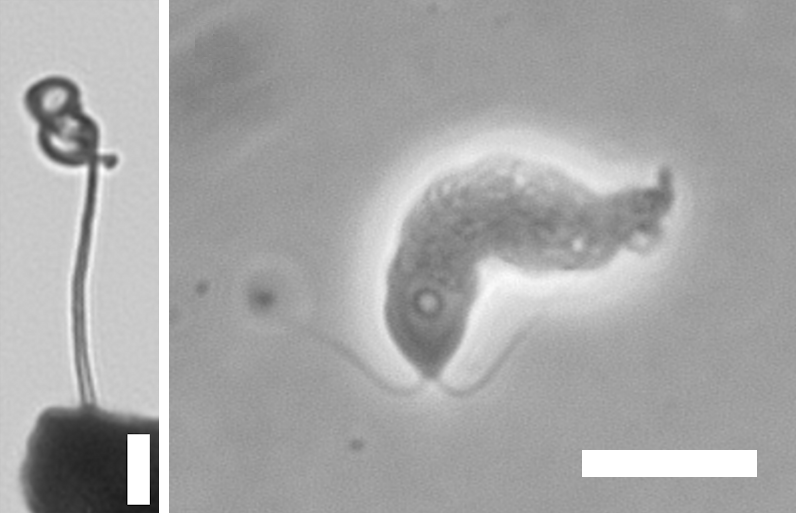
- Protosporangium articulatum fruiting body (left) and amoeboflagellate (right)

Scientific classification
- Domain: Eukaryota
- Supergroup: Amorphea
- Phylum: Amoebozoa
- Infraphylum: Eumycetozoa
- Class: Ceratiomyxomycetes; D. Hawksw., B. Sutton & Ainsw. 2019
- Order: Ceratiomyxales; G.W. Martin ex M.L. Farr & Alexop. 1977

Families
- Ceratiomyxaceae; Protosporangiidae

Synonyms
- Ceratiomyxea (zoological variant); Protosporangiida Shadwick & Spiegel in Adl et al. 2012; Ceratiomyxida Martin 1961 ex Farr & Alexopoulos

= Ceratiomyxales =

Order of amoebae

Ceratiomyxales (in botanical nomenclature) or Protosporangiida (in zoological nomenclature) is an order of slime moulds, a type of amoeboid microorganisms capable of forming macroscopic fruiting bodies. It is the sole order of the class Ceratiomyxomycetes (botanical) or Ceratiomyxea (zoological). They are eumycetozoans, or "true" slime moulds, together with myxogastrids and dictyostelids.

== Description ==
Members of Ceratiomyxales are slime moulds, amoeboid protists capable of producing fruiting bodies. Like other slime moulds, they have a complex life cycle that includes amoeboflagellates and plasmodia. Their fruiting bodies (sporocarps) are protosteloid, meaning they consist of a microscopic stalk supporting one, two, four or eight spores. Exceptionally, the genus Ceratiomyxa is the only protosteloid amoeba whose sporocarps are large enough to be seen with the naked eye.

The short-lived amoeboflagellate stage of their life cycle is covered with a coat of fine hairs and has multiple flagella. The flagellar cytoskeleton is distinct between Ceratiomyxales and myxogastrids, their closest relatives: the third microtubular rootlet consists of only two microtubules, whereas in myxogastrids the microtubules are numerous. Amoeboflagellates convert into obligate amoebae or begin forming the plasmodial stage, likely after syngamy (i.e., fusion of cell nuclei). The resulting plasmodia can remain small, under a millimetre, or reach over a metre in size, and are reticulate (net-like). Each protosteloid fructification originates separatedly, or from a common layer of extracellular slime of different textures depending on the species.

== Taxonomy ==
The order Ceratiomyxales was first coined in 1949 by G. W. Martin as an order of myxomycetes containing only the family Ceratiomyxaceae with the genus Ceratiomyxa. However it was not validly published until 1977, when M. L. Farr and Constantine J. Alexopoulos provided a Latin diagnosis, which was required for the valid publication of botanical names at the time in accordance to the International Code of Botanical Nomenclature. Similarly, the class Ceratiomyxomycetes was initially proposed in 1983 but only validated in 2019.

Through phylogenetic analyses and morphological similarities, it was found that Ceratiomyxa, Clastostelium and Protosporangium form a single clade separate from all other myxomycetes. In 2012, a separate order for the three genera was proposed as Protosporangiida, and considered to be outside of myxomycetes. The group has been recognized since 2017 as one of the three clades of Eumycetozoa, together with myxogastrids (=myxomycetes sensu stricto) and dictyostelids. Since 2019 onwards, the name Ceratiomyxales was reinstated and became the preferred variant among mycologists. In addition, the class Ceratiomyxomycetes or Ceratiomyxea was formally described, to match the class-level ranks of dictyostelids and myxogastrids.

- Class Ceratiomyxomycetes (ICZN: Ceratiomyxea)
  - Order Ceratiomyxales (ICZN: Protosporangiida / Ceratiomyxida)
    - Family Ceratiomyxaceae (ICZN: Ceratiomyxidae)
      - Genus Ceratiomyxa
    - Family Protosporangiaceae (ICZN: Protosporangiidae)
      - Genus Protosporangium
      - Genus Clastostelium
