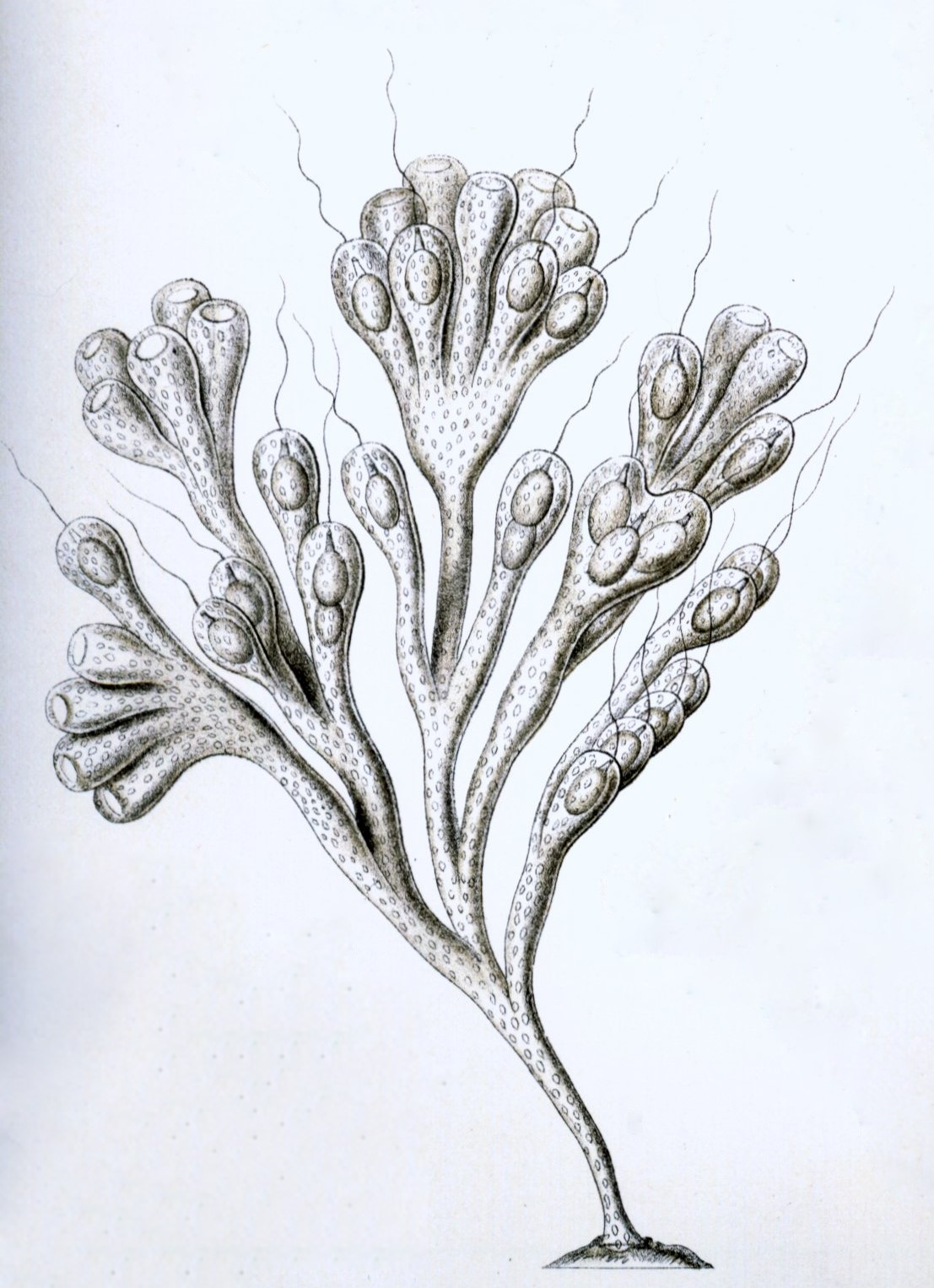
- Phalansterium digitatum

Scientific classification
- Domain: Eukaryota
- Phylum: Amoebozoa
- Class: Variosea
- Order: Phalansteriida; W.H.Jackson, 1888

Families
- See text

= Phalansteriida =

Phalansteriida is an order of Amoebozoa.

Families:

- Phalansteriidae W.S.Kent, 1881
- Rhizomonadidae Cavalier-Smith, 2013
- Trichonematidae Cavalier-Smith, 2012
