= Clastostelium =

Scientific classification
- Domain: Eukaryota
- Supergroup: Amorphea
- Phylum: Amoebozoa
- Class: Protosteliomycetes
- Order: Protosteliales
- Family: Protosteliaceae
- Genus: Clastostelium
- Species: C. recurvatum

Binomial name
- Clastostelium recurvatum L.S.Olive & Stoian., 1977

Genus and species of amoebozoa

Clastostelium is a genus of amoebozoa containing only the single species Clastostelium recurvatum. The species was first described by L.S. Olive and Carmen Stoianovitch in 1977. It has a unique stalk and dispersal mechanism. Protistologists F.W. Spiegel and J. Feldman identify C. recurvatum as being very closely related to Protosporangium, indicating that C. recurvatum belongs to a group that represents some of the most myxomycete-like protostelids recognized. In the same paper, Spiegel and Feldman also discuss C. recurvatum's tendency to exist in two different trophic states, an obligate amoeboid state and an ameboflagellate state, the latter of which can be considered one of the features that supports C. recurvatum's close relationship to the myxomycetes.

== Ecology ==
When cultured, Clastostelium recurvatum has shown to grow well on hay infusion or lactose-yeast agar. The type of media upon which C. recurvatum is cultured also appears to have an effect on the morphology of the growing amoebae and cysts. When growing on the lactose-yeast agar in particular, C. recurvatum is best cultivated at a pH between 6.5 and 7 in the presence of the bacteria Aerobacter aerogenes or another unidentified pink bacterium isolated from the original substrate from which the C. recurvatum sample was isolated. In terms of C. recurvatum's natural environment, it can most commonly be found on dead grass and leguminous pods, as these were the locations from which C. recurvatum was first isolated.

== Morphology ==
Despite its status as an underrecognized species, Clastostelium recurvatum's morphology has been described in great detail. The organism's sporocarps, for example, are usually two-spored but can possess up to four spores. The typical C. recurvatum sporocarp is approximately 20 to 42 micrometers tall. Additionally, the unique stalk of C. recurvatum's sporocarp exhibits two distinct segments – the lower segment is short and spike-like with a discoid base while the upper segment is longer, curved, and has an inflated appearance. Descriptions of C. recurvatum's spore morphology are equally as detailed as those of its sporocarps. C. recurvatum's spores usually exist as smooth-walled, paired structures. The spores are most commonly hemispherical to subglobose in shape and have been measured to be approximately 7.2 to 12 micrometers wide. It is also noted that each of these spores will germinate into one or two flagellate cells or into a singular amoeboid cell.

Aspects of this species' morphology that have also been described include that of C. recurvatum's primary trophic stage and cysts. The primary trophic stage of C. recurvatum can be described as an "amoeboid protoplast". This "amoeboid protoplast" can have variable nuclearity, ranging from uninucleate to plurinucleate. This stage also possesses a paranuclear microtubular organizing center, as well as a prominent cell coat. Compared to C. recurvatum's other trophic form, the ameboflagellate form, this ameboid stage possesses less condensed chromatin and exhibits several differences in organelles, such as that it has many inflated vacuoles and lacks kinetosomes. C. recurvatum's cysts are described as ranging from "round to ovate or irregular in outline". Similar to C. recurvatum's trophic state, these cysts can be uninucleate to plurinucleate. In terms of size, the cysts generally have approximate dimensions of 7.2-47 x 7.2-62 micrometers.

== Behavior ==
Clastostelium recurvatum exists in two different trophic stages. These trophic stages include an ameboflagellate stage and an obligate amoeba stage. The ameboflagellate stage is short-lived, existing for only approximately 2 hours, and is covered with a distinct coat of fibrous material. This ameboflagellate stage is important in establishing the close relationship between C. recurvatum and the myxomycetes because this form exhibits the morphology of a myxomycete swarm cell with a "flagellar apparatus at the conical, anterior end of the cell in association with the single nucleus". Spiegel and Feldman also state that this form shares synapomorphies with both Protosporangium and Ceratiomyxa. C. recurvatum's other trophic form, the obligate amoeba stage, can be described as a "broad cell with wide, flat pseudopodia with acutely pointed subpseudopodia" and is often C. recurvatum's primary trophic form.

Other relevant behavioral information includes that of sporocarp formation and spore germination. The sporocarps of C. recurvatum develop most abundantly in the presence of light. Stalk development will occur in approximately 1.5 hours, with spore release occurring several hours later. These spores are forcibly discharged approximately 100 to 350 micrometers via an unclear mechanism. Once discharged, the spores will germinate in water into one of many potential forms: two flagellated cells, one binucleate cell with or without flagella, uninucleate flagellate cells, or amoeboid cells. This germination will occur within one to several hours of spore release. Approximately 9 days after this germination occurs, sporocarps will begin to form. Also important to note is that there is no documented evidence of syngamy within the Clastostelium recurvatum species.
