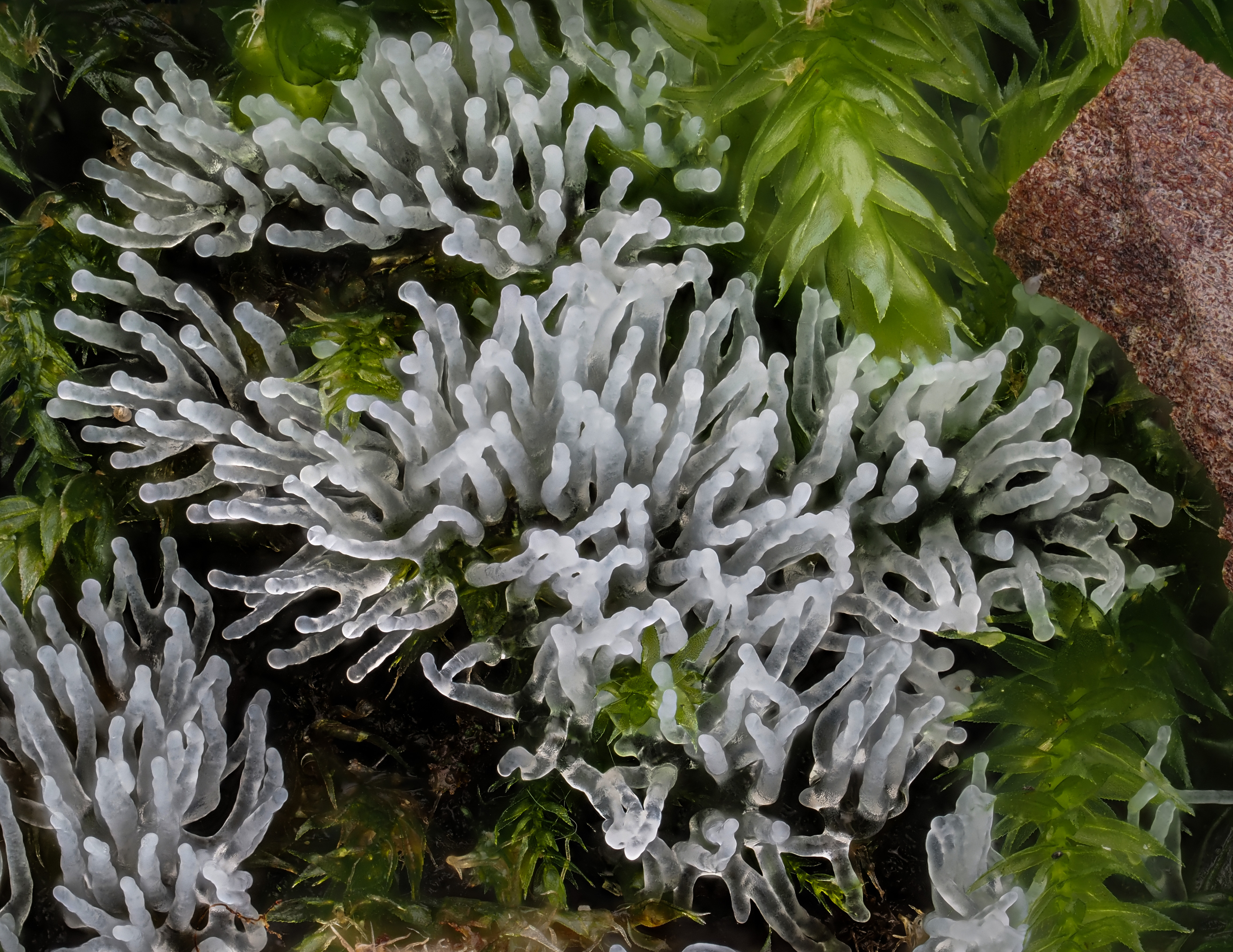
- Ceratiomyxa fruticulosa

Scientific classification
- Domain: Eukaryota
- Phylum: Amoebozoa
- Class: Ceratiomyxomycetes
- Order: Ceratiomyxales
- Family: Ceratiomyxaceae; J. Schrot. (1889)
- Genus: Ceratiomyxa; J. Schrot. (1889)

Type species
- Ceratiomyxa mucida (Pers.) J. Schröt.

Species
- C. fruticulosa C. hemisphaerica C. morchella C. porioides C. sphaerosperma

= Ceratiomyxa =

Genus of slime moulds

Ceratiomyxa is a genus of plasmodial slime mould within the Eumycetozoa, first described by Pier Antonio Micheli. They are widely distributed and commonly found on decaying wood.

The plasmodium often appears as white frost-like growth or thin watery layers on wood. Pillar or wall-like sporangia bud from the plasmodium and develop spores that undergo multiple divisions before they release flagellated zoospores. The zoospores will then pair off, undergo plasmogamy, and form zygotes that will later form new plasmodia.

The genus currently contains four species. The most notable member is Ceratiomyxa fruticulosa, a slime mould found in most parts of the world. Other known species of Ceratiomyxa are mostly found in the tropics

The genus is, by area, the largest macroscopic slime mold known that is not a part of the myxogastria; and is thus the largest protosteloid.

== Etymology ==
Ceratiomyxa comes from the Latin word ceratus meaning "waxed" and the ancient Greek word myxa meaning "mucus".

== History of knowledge ==
Ceratiomyxa was first described under the name Puccinia ramose (later revised to Ceratiomyxa fruticulosa) in 1729 by Pier Antonio Micheli, a pioneer of mycology. In 1805, Albertini and Schweinitz described 2 more species in the genus, C. hydnoides and C. porioides. However, because Ceratiomyxa species can take a variety of different forms, many forms first described as species are later considered synonyms. This includes C. hydnoideum and C. porioides which are now often considered synonyms of C. fruticulosa. However, phylogenetic analyses have shown C. porioides should be considered a distinct species.

Ceratiomyxa was first placed in the subclass Ceratiomyxomycetidae of the class Myxomycetes by Martin and Alexopoulos in 1969, but was later moved to subclass Protostelia of the class Eumycetozoa by Olive in 1970.

== Habitat and ecology ==
Ceratiomyxa is commonly found on rotting wood. Large logs and stumps are cited as ideal substrates for growth, although smaller colonies can also be found on tree branches. The Ceratiomyxa collection of Henry C. Gilbert has specimen growing on various evergreen coniferous trees (Pseudotsuga), elm (Ulmus), maple (Acer), oak (Quercus), Tilia, and willows (Salix). A specimen collected by F. O. Grover was found growing on a burlap sack.

Species of Ceratiomyxa can be found world-wide. C. fruticulosa is the most common species and has a cosmopolitan distribution. C. morchella and C. sphaerosperma have only been recorded in the tropics.

== Morphology ==
Plasmodium: Net-like or thin layer enveloped in mucous. Often translucent or white in colour but can also be tinted slightly yellow, pink, or blue-green. The protoplasm within the plasmodium can be seen flowing, resting, and resuming flow in the opposite direction. This occurs in intervals of approximately 40 seconds. Protoplasmic flow slows as the sporangia develop and halt completely during mitosis.

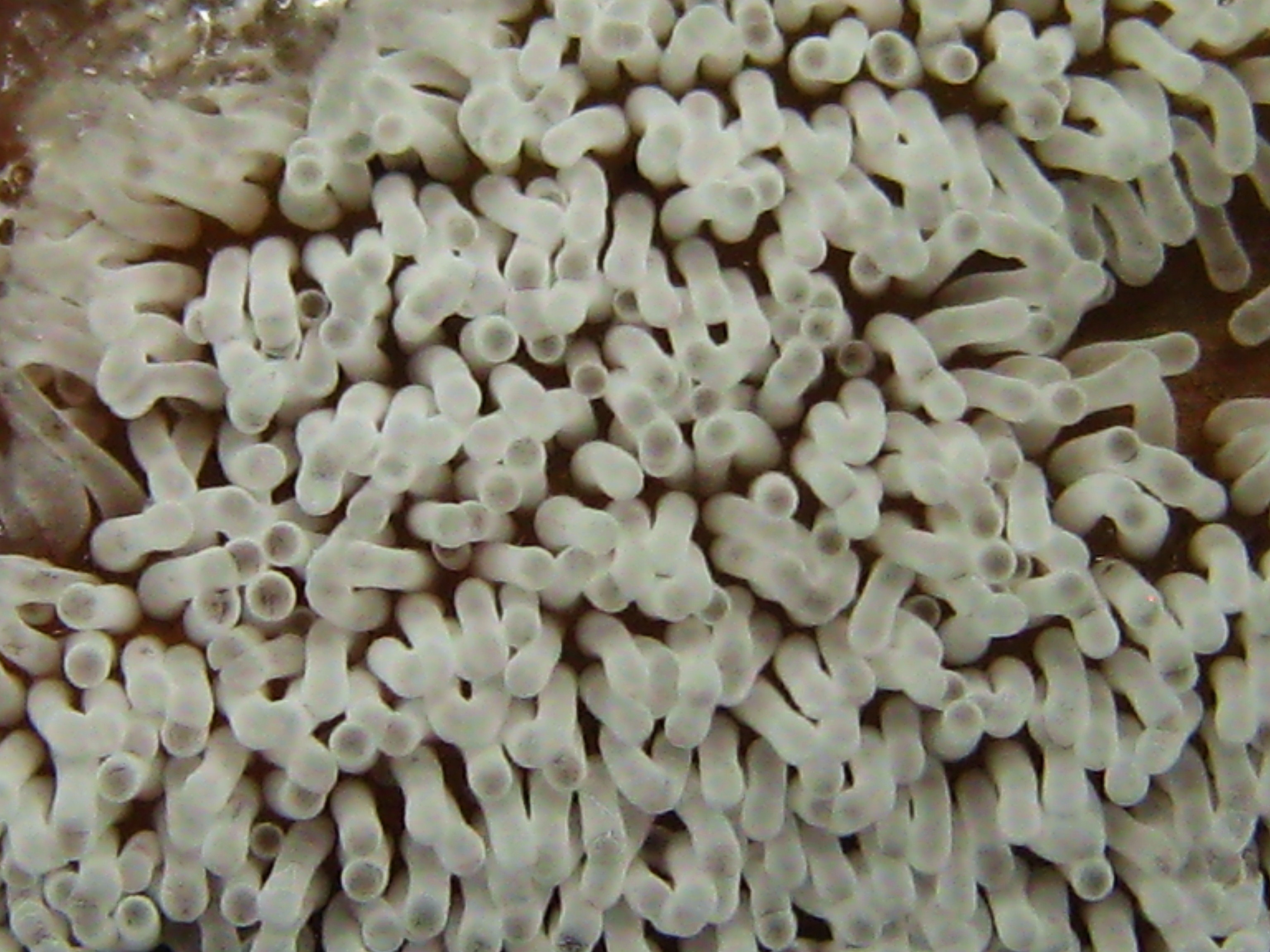
Ceratiomyxa fruticulosa

Sporangia: Can be found in many different forms. Common forms include:

- Simple pillar: Pillar-like projections. In some species, pillars expand at the base and fuse to form a layer of plasmodium
- Fruticulus: Clusters of finger-like projections that are usually undivided
- Arbuscula: Branched resembling small trees. Spores develop on branch surfaces
- Filiforme: Long and slender pillars
- Porioides: Net-like formations of walls. Spores develop on sides and edges of wall

Spores: The spores are round or oval globules individually attached to stalks sprouting from sporangia. Spores vary in size (8–13 μm in diameter). The spore walls are thin and transparent. Spores appear grainy and may have some vacuoles which are often near the perimeter or surrounding the nucleus. The nucleus within the spore is about 3 μm in diameter.

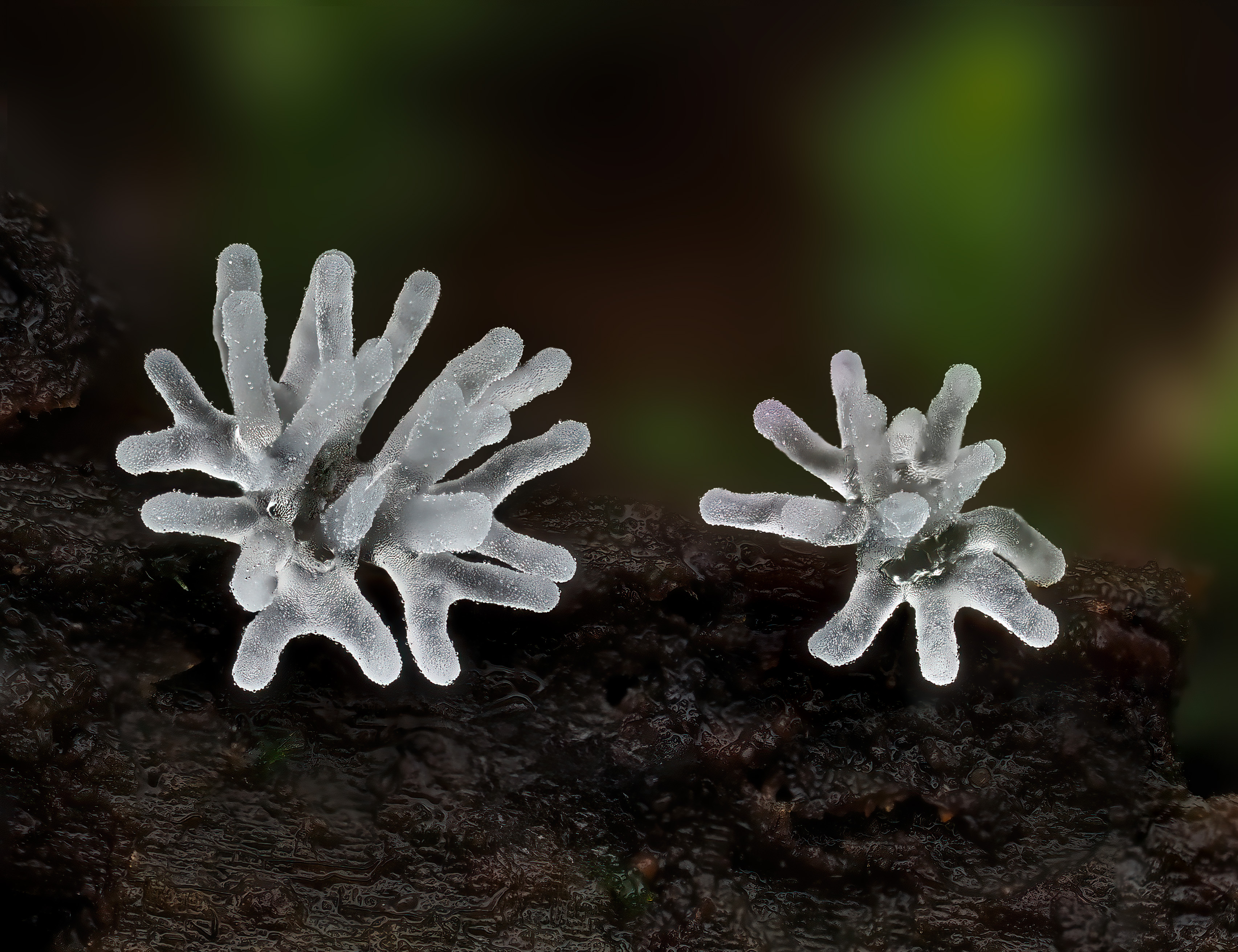
Ceratiomyxa fruticulosa close-up photo

Swarm cells: Oblong with either one long flagellum, one long and one short flagellum, or two long flagella. The flagella may occur together or at opposite ends of the cell. Upon emergence, the swarm cells are 6–8 μm in length and can develop to around 12 μm in older cells.

== Life cycle ==
Ceratiomyxa plasmodia is diploid and can often be found emerging from rotting wood and spreading into a thin layer. The plasmodium then fruits to form sporangia: erect pillar or wall-like structures. The sporangia mature in about six hours. Many small stalks emerge from the sporangia to form protospores. Meiosis then begins in the protospores. Synapsis of the chromosomes in prophase is achieved at this stage.

After the stalks have fully elongated, a thin transparent wall is secreted around the protospores to become spores. Spores take approximately 24 hours to mature. The first meiotic division is then completed in the spores followed by a second meiotic division which leaves the spore with four nuclei.

After dispersal, these four-nucleate spores germinate and naked protoplasts emerge. The protoplasts take in water upon emergence and enlarge to about 3 times the size of the spore from which they emerged. The protoplasts then form short thread-like filaments that later retract back into round globules. In some cases, the protoplast skips the thread phase and remains isodiametric. The nuclei then migrate to four points of a tetrahedron and the protoplast cleaves into a tetrad of lobes. Soon after, the tetrad undergoes mitosis and splits again into an octette of haploid cells.

Each cell releases a swarm cell with either one long flagellum, two unequal flagella, or two long flagella. The flagella are apical and whiplash type. The swarm cells may then lose their flagella and become asexual myxamoebae or undergo syngamy in pairs to produce a diploid zygote.

== List of species ==
Genus Ceratiomyxa currently includes five species:

- Ceratiomyxa fruticulosa Micheli, 1729
- Ceratiomyxa porioides (Alb. & Schwein.) J. Schröt., 1893
- Ceratiomyxa sphaerosperma Boedijn, 1927
- Ceratiomyxa morchella Weldon, 1954
- Ceratiomyxa hemisphaerica Olive and Stoianovitch, 1979
