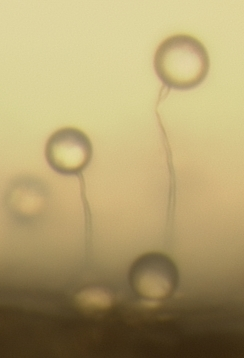
- Protostelium mycophaga sporocarps

Scientific classification
- Domain: Eukaryota
- Phylum: Amoebozoa
- Class: Variosea
- Order: Protosteliida; Olive & Stoianovitch 1966, emend. Shadwick & Spiegel in Adl et al. 2012
- Family: Protosteliidae; Olive & Stoianovitch 1966
- Genus: Protostelium; Olive & Stoianovitch 1960 emend. Spiegel et al. 2017

Type species
- Protostelium mycophaga Olive & Stoianovitch 1960

Synonyms
- Planoprotostelium; Olive & Stoianovitch 1971

= Protostelium =

Genus of slime molds

Protostelium is a genus of protosteloid amoebozoans, i.e., amoebae capable of forming simple fruiting bodies composed of a stalk and a ball of spores. It contains numerous species, including P. aurantium, which was initially classified in a different genus Planoprotostelium. Phylogenetic analyses revealed that Planoprotostelium branches from within the genus Protostelium, making them synonyms.

The genus is placed in the family Protosteliidae within the monotypic order Protosteliida, which is part of a larger group of amoebozoans known as Variosea.

== Classification ==
Many species from the genus Protostelium have been transferred over time to other protosteloid genera. The following species remain:

- Protostelium apiculatum Shadwick & Spiegel 2017
- Protostelium aurantium (Olive & Stoianovitch 1971) Shadwick & Spiegel 2017 (=Planoprotostelium aurantium Olive & Stoianovitch 1971)
- Protostelium mycophaga Olive & Stoianovitch 1960
- Protostelium nocturnum Spiegel 1984
- Protostelium okumukumu Spiegel, Shadwick & Hemmes 2006
