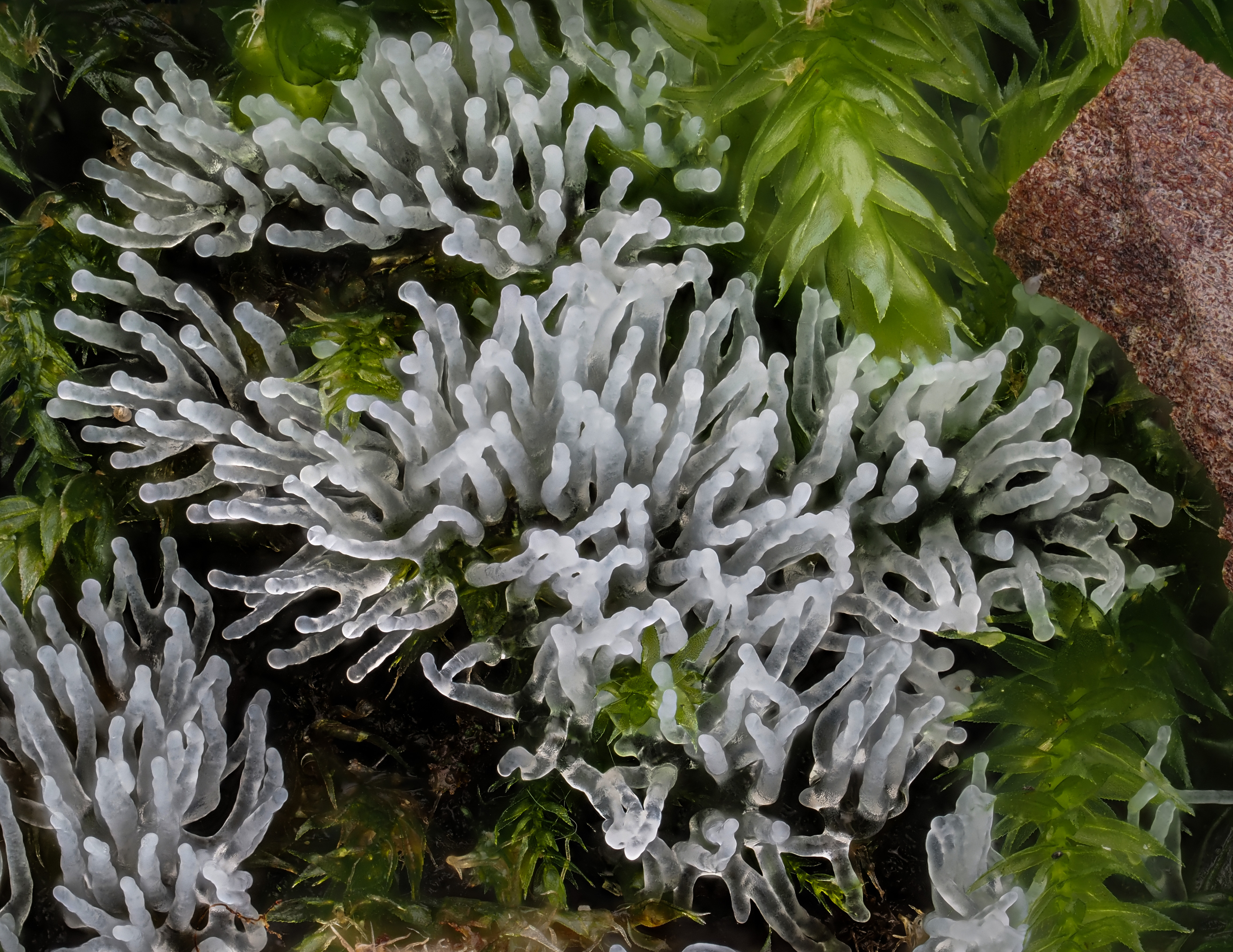
- Ceratiomyxa fruticulosa

Scientific classification
- Domain: Eukaryota
- Supergroup: Amorphea
- Phylum: Amoebozoa
- Class: Ceratiomyxomycetes
- Order: Ceratiomyxales
- Family: Ceratiomyxaceae
- Genus: Ceratiomyxa
- Species: C. fruticulosa

Binomial name
- Ceratiomyxa fruticulosa (O.F.Müll.) T.Macbr., 1899

Synonyms
- List: Byssus fruticulosa O.F. Müll. (1777); Tremella hydnoides Jacq. (1778); Reticularia hydnoides (Jacq.) With. (1796); Ceratium hydnoides (Jacq.) Alb. & Schwein. (1805); Ceratiopsis hydnoides (Jacq.) De Wild. (1896); Ceratiomyxa hydnoides (Jacq.) Kuntze (1898); Ceratiomyxa mucida var. hydnoides (Jacq.) Torrend (1907); Isaria mucida Pers. (1825); Ceratiomyxa mucida (Pers.) J. Schröt. (1889); Ceratella mucida (Pers.) Bigeard & H. Guill. (1913); Isaria mucida Schumach. (1803); Ceratium arbuscula Berk. & Broome (1873) [1875]; Ceratiopsis arbuscula (Berk. & Broome) De Wild. (1896); Ceratiomyxa arbuscula (Berk. & Broome) Pat. (1903); Ceratiomyxa mucida var. arbuscula (Berk. & Broome) Torrend (1908); Ceratiomyxa fruticulosa var. arbuscula (Berk. & Broome) Nann.-Bremek. (1975) [1974]; Ceratiomyxa mucida var. flexuosa Lister (1894); Ceratiomyxa fruticulosa var. flexuosa (Lister) G. Lister (1911); Famintzinia fruticulosa (T. Macbr.) Lado (2001)

= Ceratiomyxa fruticulosa =

Species of slime mold

white colonies of Ceratiomyxa fruticulosa on wet, rotting wood

Ceratiomyxa fruticulosa, often known as coral slime, is a species of slime mold occurring worldwide wherever it is not exceptionally cold or dry.

== Description ==
Forming dense, white patches on shaded, rotting wood of fallen logs and branches in various forest types, Ceratiomyxa fruticulosa, forms white colonies up to a meter long (3.3 feet), though usually they are much smaller. These colonies do not live long; they appear after a soaking rain, then vanish within a few days.

As with other slime molds, the easy-to-see colonies represent the spore-producing or sporophyte stage. Before this stage, the species appears as thin, watery, translucent, mucus-like films of protoplasm which creep very slowly across the wet wood or other substrate. As they move along they engulf bacteria, protozoa, and particles of nonliving organic matter. When the time comes to produce spores, the conversion from the protoplasm stage to the sporophyte stage takes about six hours.

== Taxonomy ==
Ceratiomyxa fruticulosa was described originally by Otto Friedrich Müller as Byssus fruticulosa in 1777 but was later transferred to the genus Ceratiomyxa by Thomas Macbride in 1899.

Historically, the species was classified as a fungus because of its spore-producing structures. It is now classified under Amoebozoa, which is a group of eukaryotic organisms that includes amoeboid forms.

The taxonomy of Ceratiomyxa has undergone substantial revision. Several morphologically distinct forms were historically treated as varieties of C. fruticulosa.

=== Varieties ===
the former Ceratiomyxa fruticulosa var. arbuscula, now considered a form of the species developing under certain weather conditions

In recent literature and on current websites, various varieties of Ceratiomyxa fruticulosa may be listed, though as of October 25, 2026, no varieties were accepted for this species. Perhaps most often and most recently treated as a variety has been the variety arbuscula, on which the white, finger-like, spore-producing parts, or "sporocarps", branch 2 or 3 times, with the branches becoming very slender, and entangling with branches of neighboring sporocarps. Sporocarps of the typical form do not branch. It has been observed that whether the sporocarps branch or not depends entirely upon weather conditions prevailing during the period of spore production. Moveover, the two forms can be found growing together.

Also earlier recognized was the honeycomb coral slime mold, Ceratiomyxa fruticulosa var. porioides, but in 2024 molecular phylogenetic analysis indicated that the variety should be elevated to species level as Ceratiomyxa porioides.
