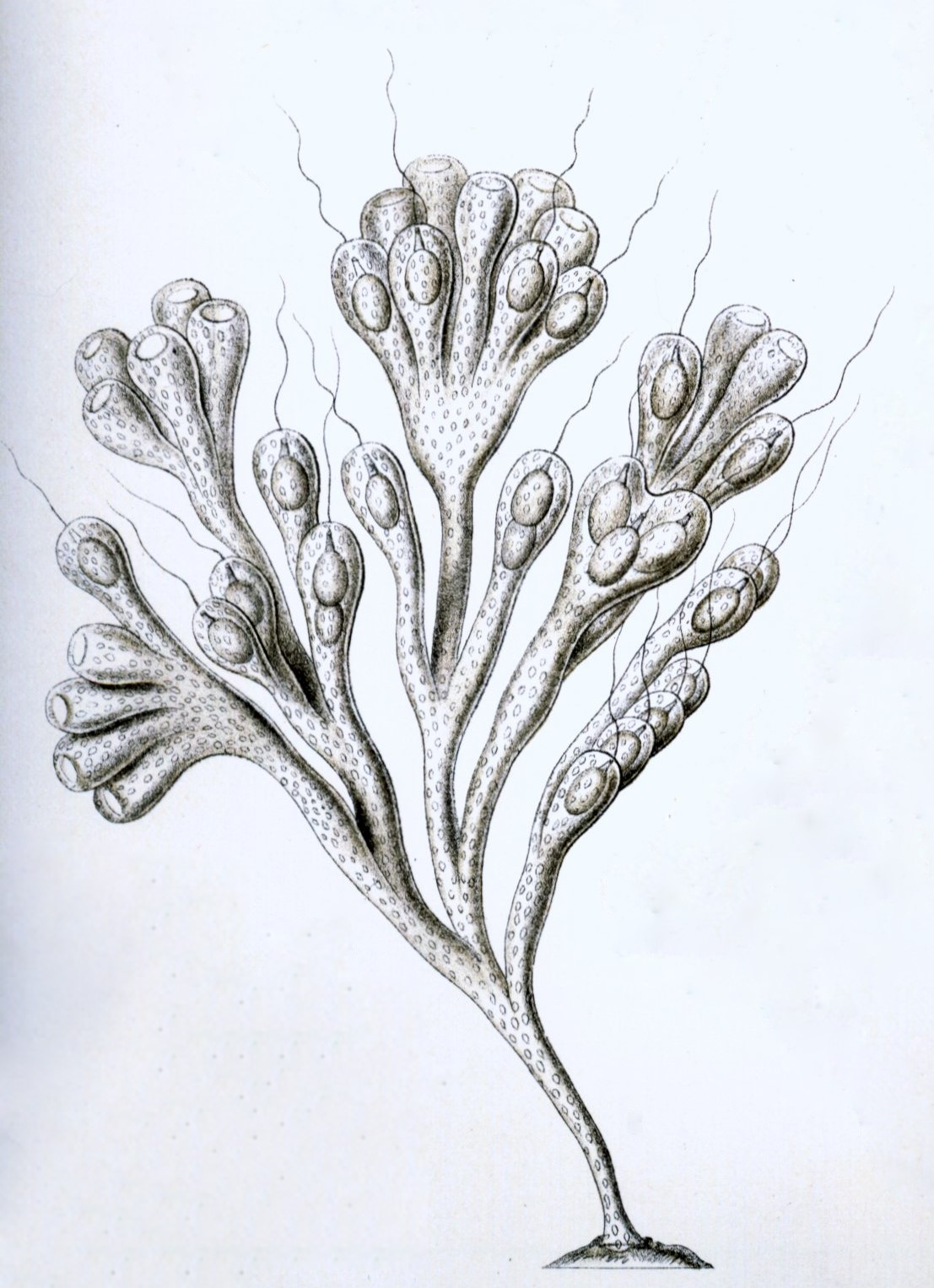
- Phalansterium digitatum

Scientific classification
- Domain: Eukaryota
- Phylum: Amoebozoa
- Subphylum: Conosa
- Class: Variosea; Cavalier-Smith, 2004

Orders
- See text

= Variosea =

Variosea is a class of Amoebozoa.

Orders:

- Holomastigaida
- Luffisphaerida
- Phalansteriida
- Stereomyxida
- Varipodida
