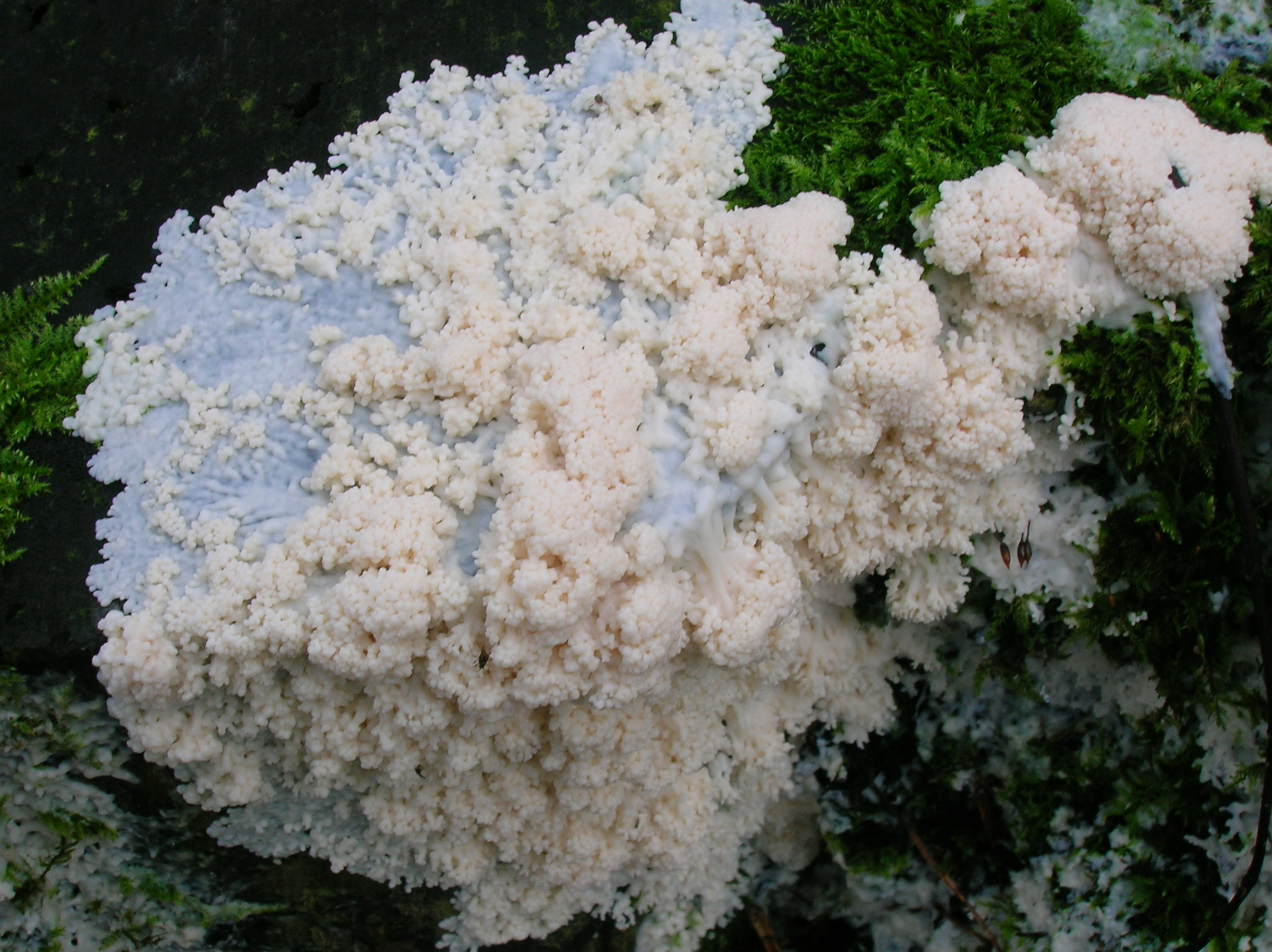

Scientific classification
- Domain: Eukaryota
- Phylum: Amoebozoa
- Class: Myxogastria
- Order: Stemonitidales
- Family: Amaurochaetaceae
- Genus: Brefeldia
- Species: B. maxima

Binomial name
- Brefeldia maxima (Fries) Rostaf. 1873

Synonyms
- Licea perreptans (Berk.) (1848); Reticularia maxima (Fr.) (1825)

= Brefeldia maxima =

Species of slime mould

Brefeldia maxima is a species of non-parasitic plasmodial slime mold, and a member of the class Myxomycetes. It is commonly known as the tapioca slime mold because of its peculiar pure white, tapioca pudding-like appearance. A common species with a worldwide distribution, particularly in North America and Europe. It is often found on bark after heavy rain or excessive watering. Their spores are produced on or in aerial sporangia and are spread by wind, however beetles of the family Latridiidae are also reported to disperse the spores. Bonner states that soil invertebrates and rain mainly disperse spores as they are sticky and unlikely to be carried by air currents.

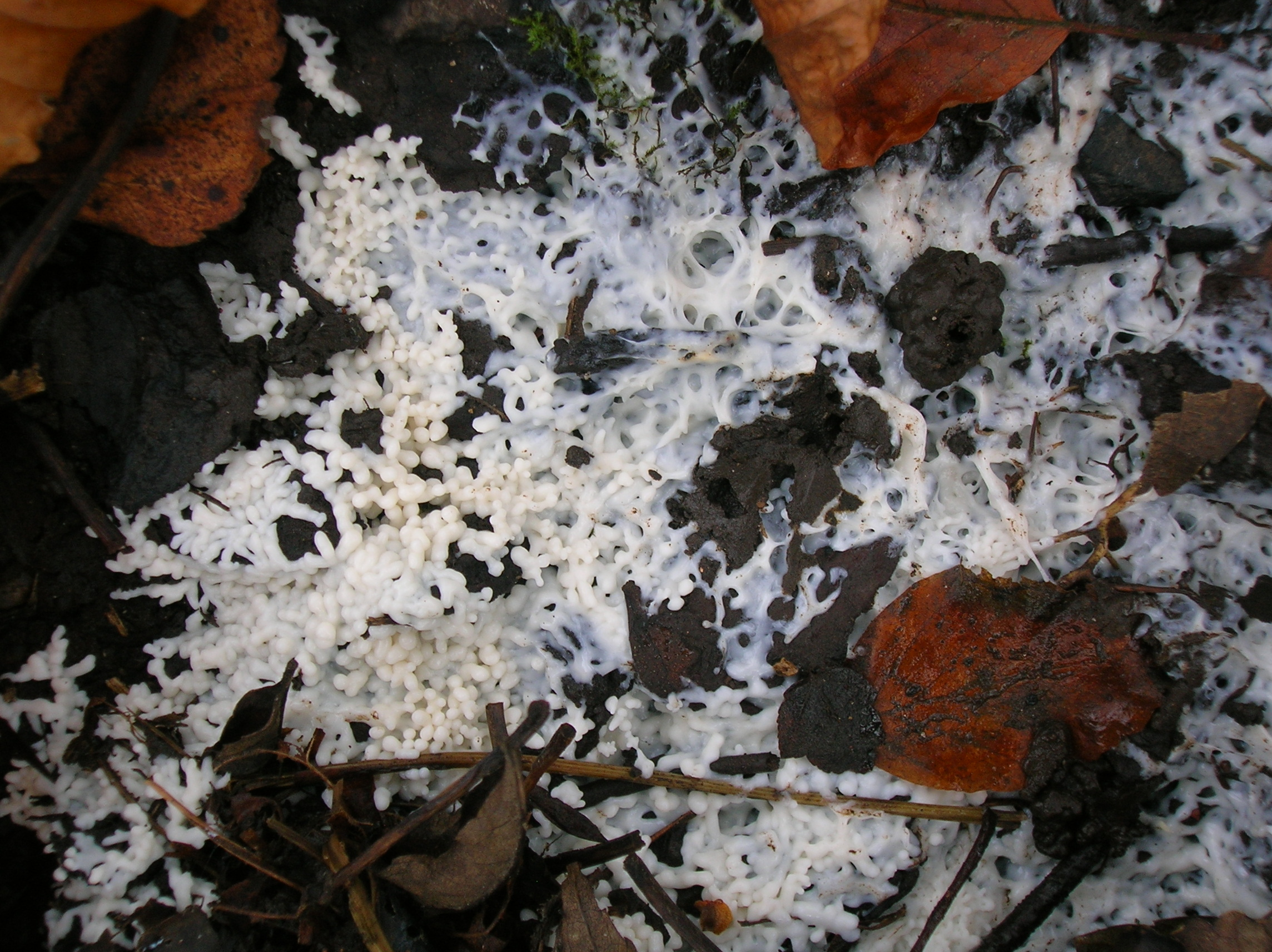
The plasmodium's capillitium amongst moss and wood.

The genus is named after German botanist and mycologist Julius Oscar Brefeld (August 19, 1839 – January 12, 1925).

== Distribution ==
Found throughout the United Kingdom and common in Europe, Brefeldia maxima is known to be much rarer in North America.

== Description and habitat ==
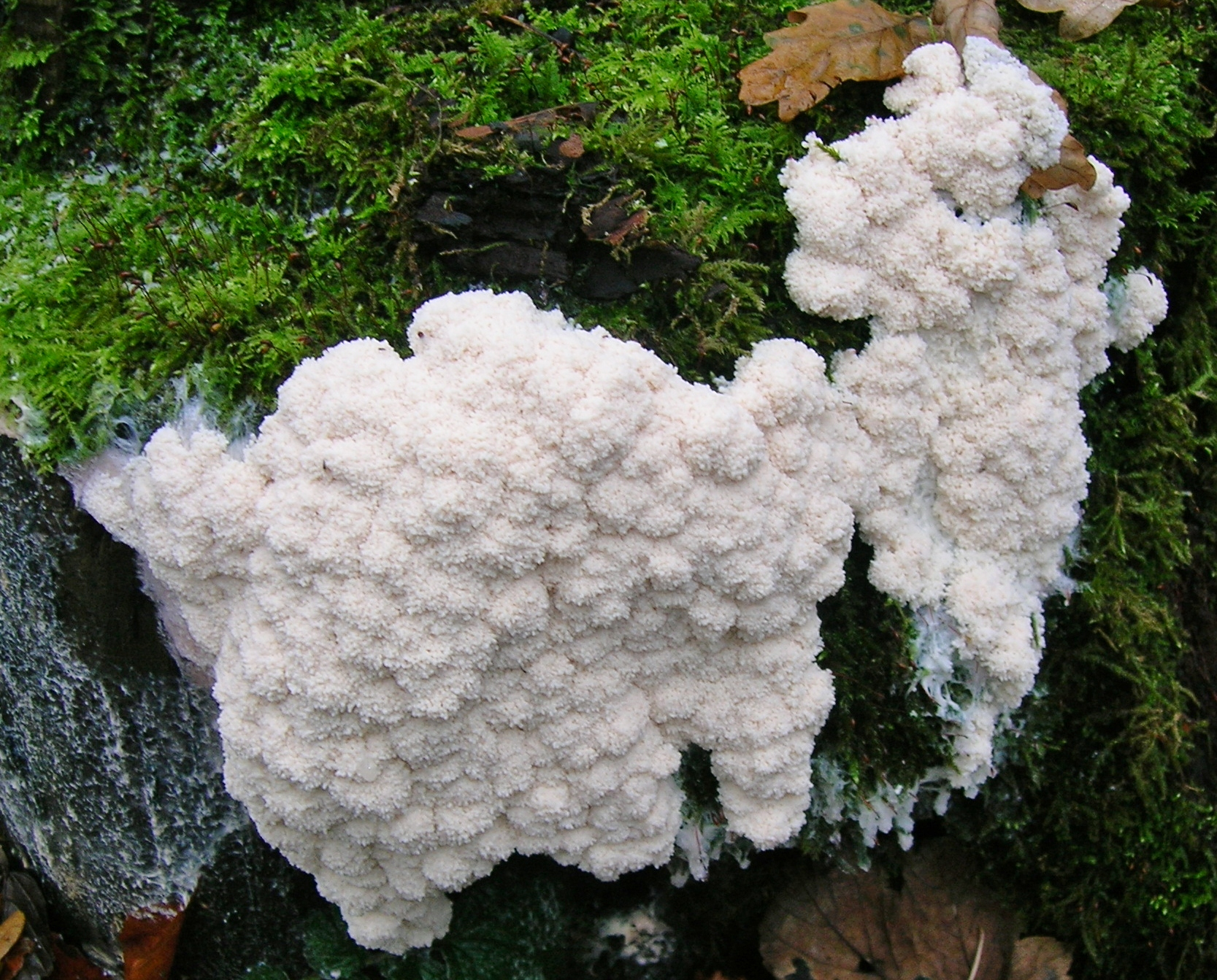
The same plasmodium as all the other illustrations, but 5 days later. Note area to the left where the plasmodium was located previously.

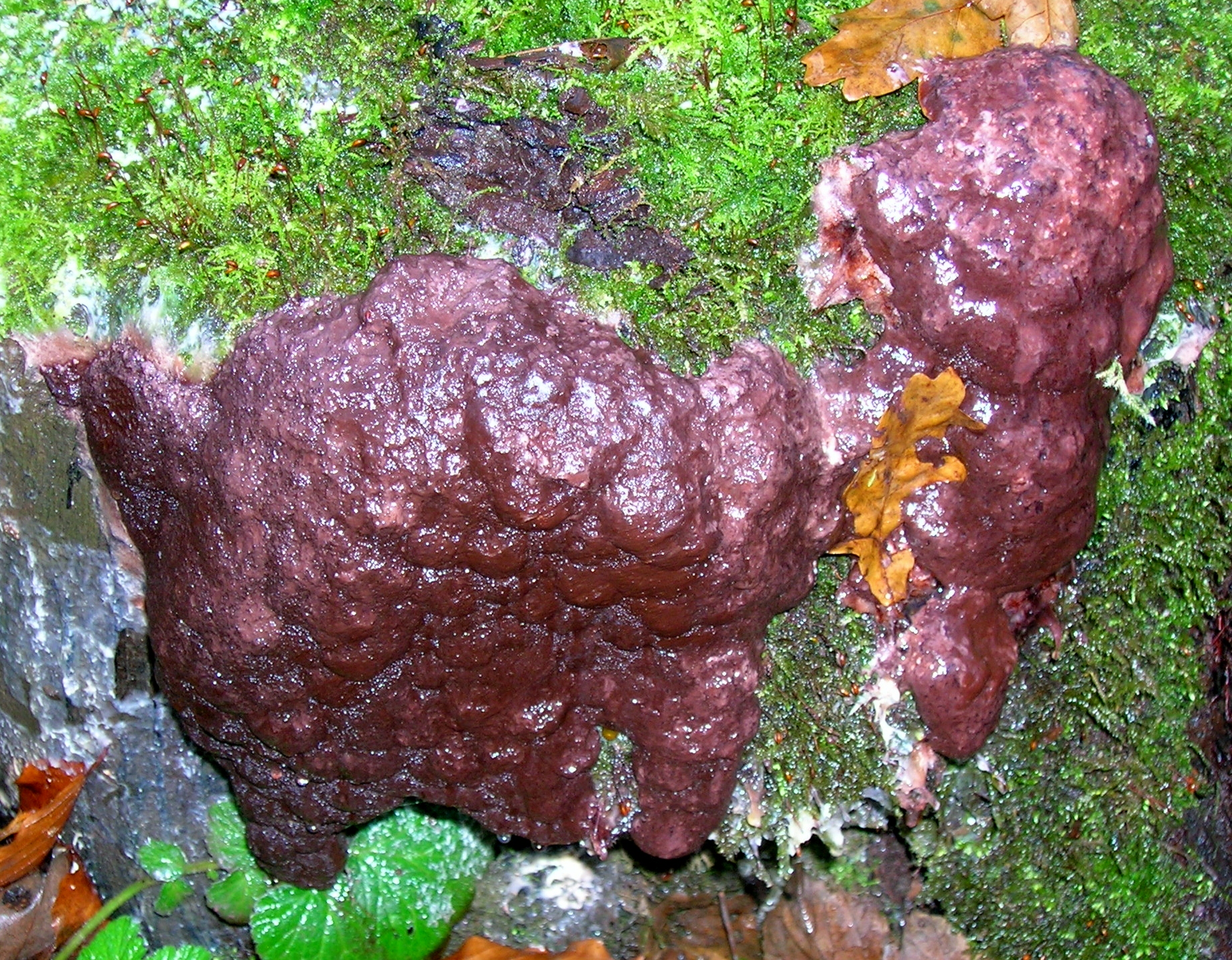
The same plasmodium entering the full sporulating phase.

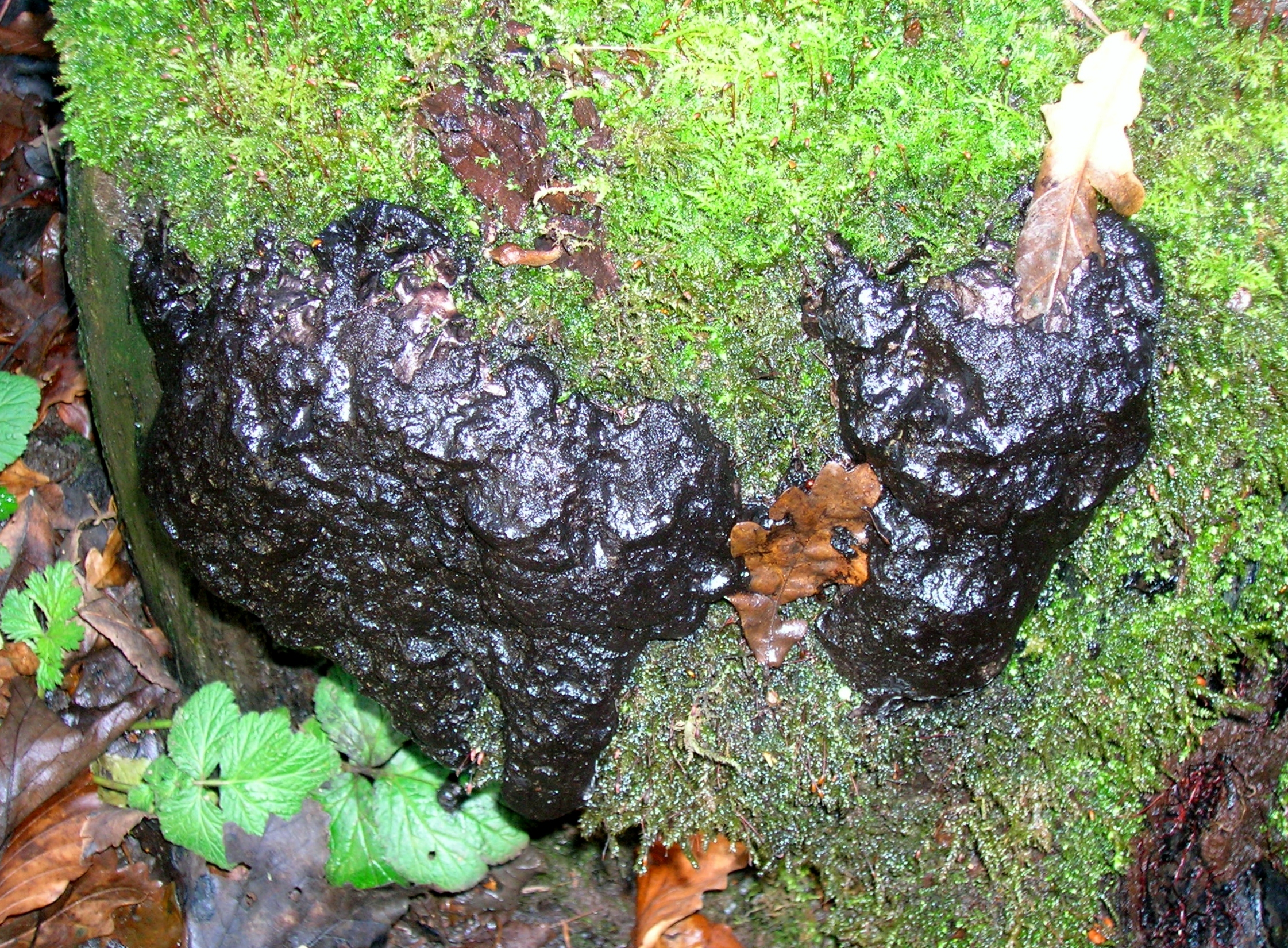
The same plasmodium 15 days into the sporulating phase and after heavy rain.

No longer regarded as a fungus, Brefeldia belongs to the group colloquially known as plasmodial or acellular slime molds, although known within the scientific community as myxomycetes, the term no longer refers to a formal taxonomic group. Brefeldia maxima is one of the largest of the slime molds and its distinctive feature is the presence of multicellular vesicles within the capillitium.

Joszef Tomasz Rostafinski (1850–1928) first described this species.

The plasmodium emerges from soil and leaves as a pure white structure, often very large and exhibiting rhythmic cytoplasmic streaming which helps transport chemicals within the organism. The plasmodium may move some distance before forming the aethalium or sporangial phase, of an equal size, 4–30 cm in its longest dimension, 5–15 mm thick, carried upon a widespread, silvery, shining hypothallus, purplish black. The cortex at first papillate, however this is a fugacious or transitory phase. The capillitium, the network of thread-like filaments in which the spores are embedded within sporangia is abundant, the threads dark, netted, the nodes bearing multicellular vesicles, the whole borne upon, but often breaking away from the flattened and irregular, columellate basal strands. The spore-mass is brownish black or a dusky colour. The spores are yellow-brown, distinctly warted, and 9-12 μm in diameter. Found living on decaying organic material, such as old tree stumps, logs, leaf mould, compost heaps, and other organic debris in fields, woods, and along the roadsides.

Essentially the white plasmodial phase is a single cell; one example of Brefeldia maxima in North Wales is recorded to have covered whole tree stumps, was a centimetre thick with a surface area of over a square metre and weighed up to around 20 kg - therefore technically amongst the largest cells known.

Related genera are Colloderma, Comatricha, Enerthenema, Lamproderma, Macbrideola, and Stemonitis.

== Bibliography ==
1. Bäumler, J.A. 1899: Notiz über Brefeldia. Verhandl.K.K.Zool.Bot.Gesellsch.Wien 49: 104-105.
2. Hechler, J. 1980: Die Myxoflagellaten von Brefeldia maxima Rost. und ihre Nahrungsaufnahme mit Hilfe von Geißelbewegungen. Mitteilungen aus dem Institut für Allgemeine Botanik in Hamburg 17: 49-55.
3. Lagerberg, T. 1945: Ett fynd av Brefeldia maxima (Fr.) Rost. Svensk botanisk tidskrift 39: 432-434.
4. Lister, A. 1888: Notes on the plasmodium of Badhamia utricularis and Brefeldia maxima. Annals of botany 2: 1-24.
