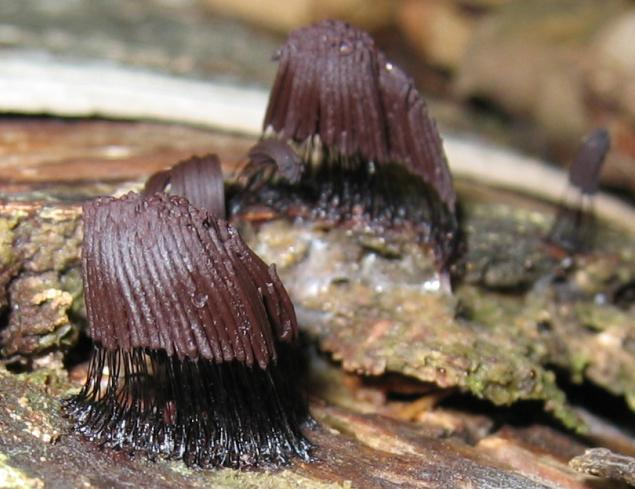
- Stemonitis fusca

Scientific classification
- Domain: Eukaryota
- Phylum: Amoebozoa
- Class: Myxogastria
- Order: Stemonitidales
- Family: Stemonitidaceae; Fr., 1829

Genera
- See text

= Stemonitidaceae =

Family of slime moulds

Stemonitidaceae is a family of slime molds in the order Stemonitidales. It was first circumscribed by Elias Magnus Fries in 1829.

== Genera ==
- Leptoderma
- Macbrideola
- Meriderma
- Paradiachea
- Stemonitis
- Symphytocarpus

Genera previously included in Stemonitidaceae, now transferred to Amaurochaetaceae:

- Amaurochaete
- Brefeldia
- Comatricha
- Enerthenema
- Stemonaria
- Stemonitopsis
- Paradiacheopsis

Genera previously included in Stemonitidaceae, now transferred to Lamprodermataceae:

- Collaria Nann.-Bremek
- Colloderma G. Lister
- Diacheopsis Meyl.
- Lamproderma Rostaf.
