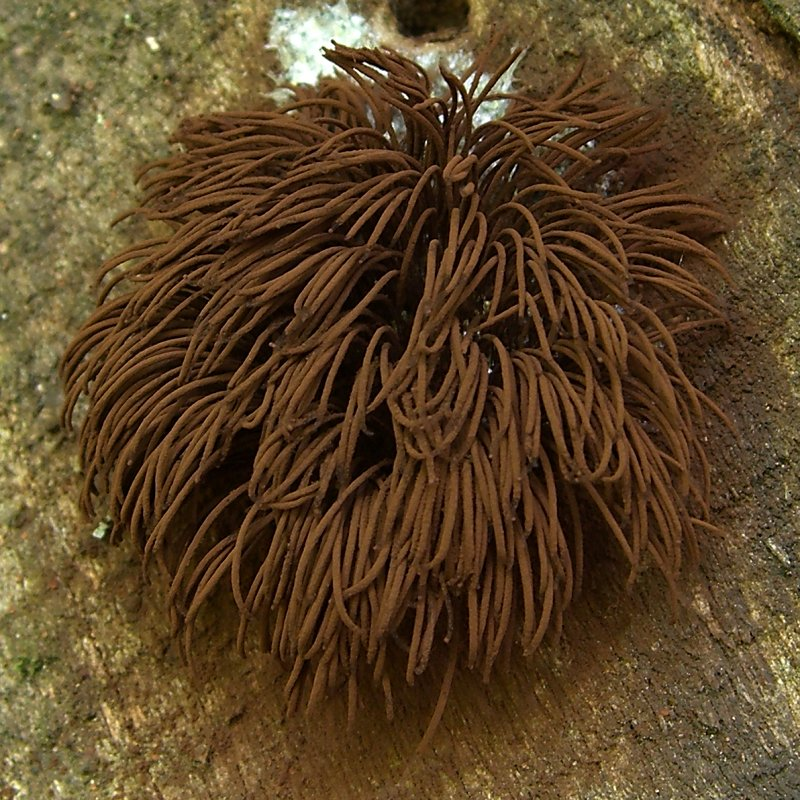
- Shenandoah Mountain, United States

Scientific classification
- Domain: Eukaryota
- Phylum: Amoebozoa
- Class: Myxogastria
- Order: Stemonitidales
- Family: Stemonitidaceae
- Genus: Stemonitis
- Species: S. splendens

Binomial name
- Stemonitis splendens Rostaf. (1875)

= Stemonitis splendens =

Species of slime mould

Stemonitis splendens, commonly known as the chocolate tube slime, is a species of slime mold.

== Description ==
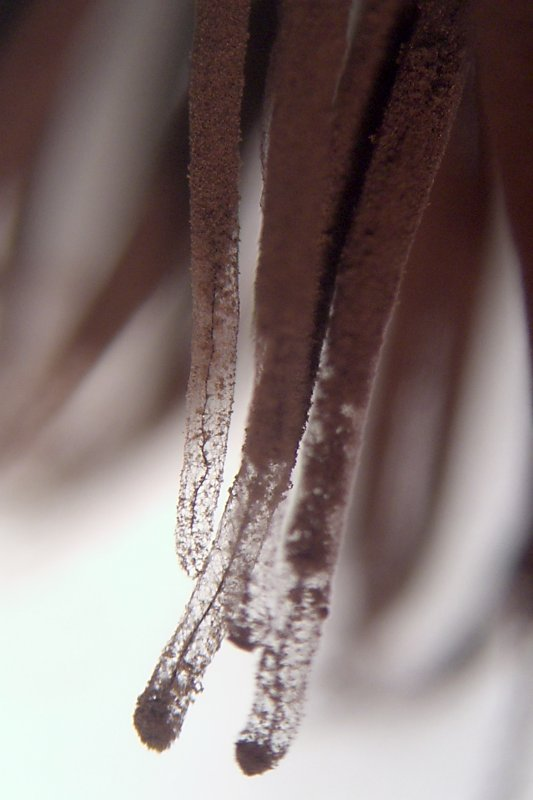
Closeup of sporangia

=== Fruiting body ===
The sporangia are dark purplish brown, smooth, dry, 10–20 mm tall, and 1–2 mm in diameter. The stem is black, 3–5 mm long, and less than 1 mm thick.

=== Spore ===
The spores are 6–9 μm in diameter, brown, globose, and covered in small warts. They are released into the air if touched.

== Ecology and distribution ==
Specimens grow in small, compact clusters on sheltered, decaying wood. It is quite common within its range. In Australia the species has been observed in all states.
