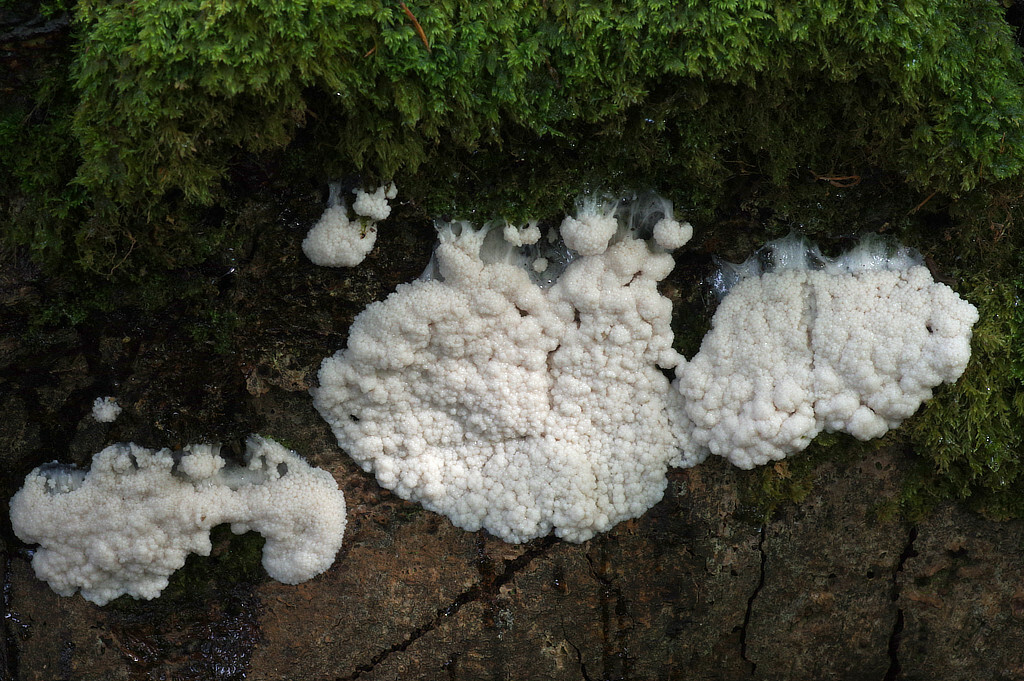
- Symphytocarpus amaurochaetoides

Scientific classification
- Domain: Eukaryota
- Phylum: Amoebozoa
- Class: Myxogastria
- Order: Stemonitidales
- Family: Stemonitidaceae
- Genus: Symphytocarpus; Ing & Nann.-Bremek. 1967

Type species
- Symphytocarpus flaccidus (Lister) Ing & Nann.-Bremek., 1967

= Symphytocarpus =

Genus of slime moulds

Symphytocarpus is a genus of slime molds in the family Stemonitidaceae. As of June 2015, there are nine species in the genus.

== Species ==
- Symphytocarpus amaurochaetoides
- Symphytocarpus confluens
- Symphytocarpus cristatus
- Symphytocarpus flaccidus
- Symphytocarpus fusiformis
- Symphytocarpus herbaticus
- Symphytocarpus impexus
- Symphytocarpus syncarpus
- Symphytocarpus trechisporus
