= Stanisław Bonifacy Jundziłł =

Polish priest and botanist

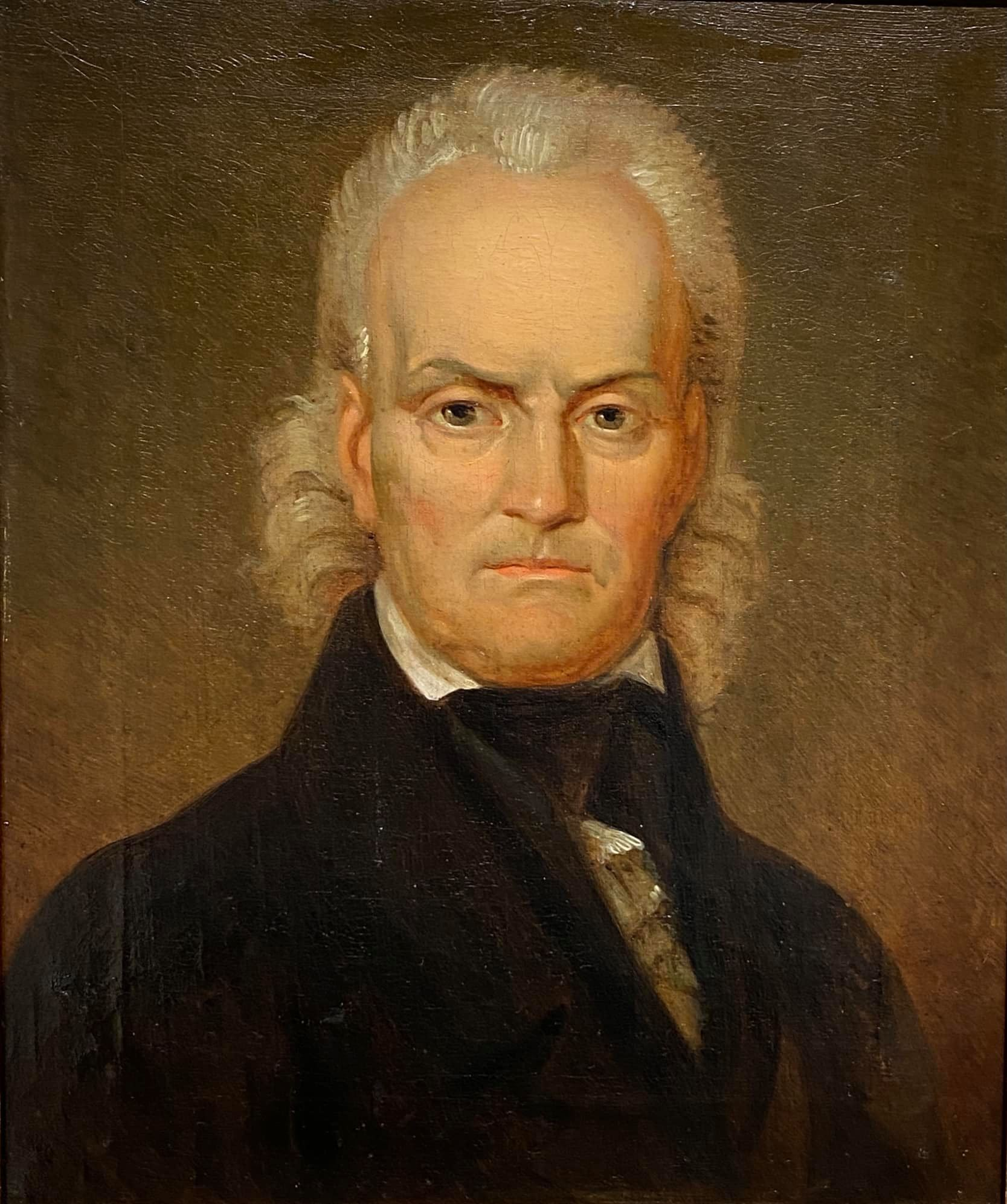
Stanisław Bonifacy Jundziłł (1822). Portrait by Jan Rustem

Stanisław Bonifacy Jundziłł or, in Lithuanian, Stanislovas Bonifacas Jundzilas (6 May 1761 in Jasiańce, Voranava District – 15 April 1847 in Vilnius) was a Polish-Lithuanian priest, botanist, educator and diarist who lectured at the University of Vilnius.

== Biography ==
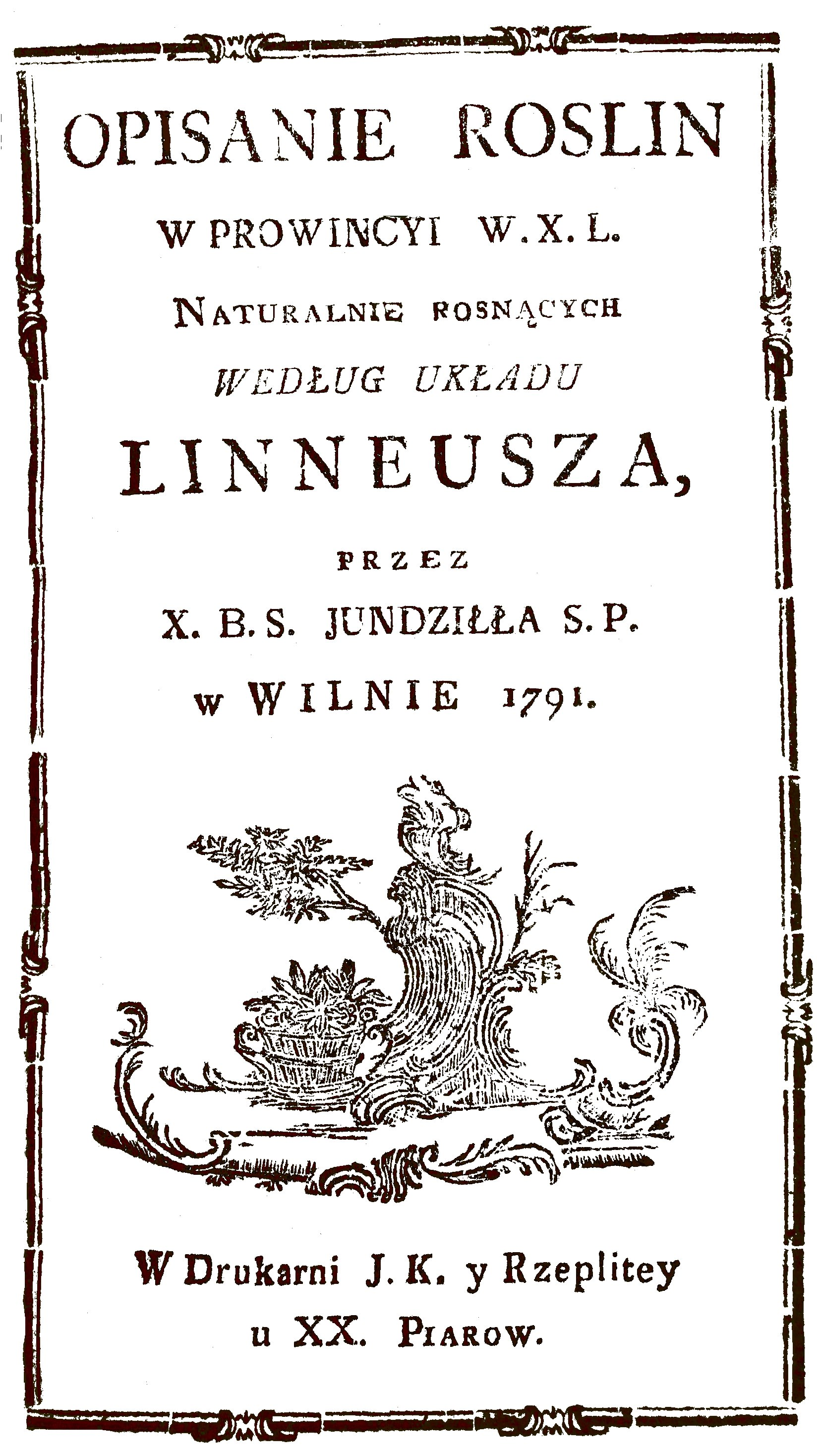
Title page from Description of Plants

Jundziłł was born in the impoverished noble family of Benedykt and Róża née Dowgiałło. He was not able to go to school until 1774, when his father married for a third time and received a very generous dowry. From 1774 to 1779, he attended schools operated by the Piarists at Lida, Szczuczyn and Lubieszów. It was during this period that he became nearly blind in his right eye. He joined the Piarist order and took vows in 1779 and was ordained a priest in 1785 after which he taught at schools in Raseiniai, Vilnius and Szczuczyn. At Vilnius he also continued his own studies in chemistry and botany with Georg Forster and Jean-Emmanuel Gilibert, and helped create a botanical garden at the university.

In 1791 he published a description of the plants in the Grand Duchy of Lithuania which used the Linnean system. He received a Merentibus gold medal from King Stanisław August Poniatowski. In 1792, he received a scholar's grant that enabled him to study abroad. He travelled throughout Eastern and Central Europe until 1794, when his grant was discontinued after the Second Partition of Poland. He met Jaquin and others on his travels and learned of Werner's Neptunism. He was again able to obtain financial assistance from Count Ignacy Potocki and Princess Izabela Czartoryska, so he remained in Vienna for a while, organizing a garden of medicinal plants at the University of Veterinary Medicine while continuing to study a wide range of subjects.

He returned to Vilnius in 1797 and, in 1800, took his doctorate in Theology. He expanded the botanical garden during this period and it had more than 6000 species of plants. His doctorate enabled him to become a professor of botany and zoology at the university in 1802. He retired in 1824 and spent much of his time travelling. In 1825 he handed over the botanical garden to a student (unrelated) Józef Jundziłł.

In his later years, he came into conflict with the new teachers at the university, criticizing their cosmopolitanism and lack of patriotism and predicting that their activities would have serious consequences; a prediction that came true when the university was closed by the Russian government in 1832. After that, saddened by the slow destruction of his beloved botanical garden, his health worsened and he eventually went totally blind.

== Scientific and pedagogical activity ==
Despite his religious training Jundziłł adopted naturalism and was one of the first to teach veterinary medicine in Lithuania and was the author of several basic textbooks on botany and zoology. His studies of migratory birds were among the earliest in that area.

He was also the author of the first scientifically precise description of the flora and fauna of Lithuania, based on the system of Carl Linnaeus, and won a gold medal for his work Botanika stosowana (Applied Botany).

== Botanical nomenclature ==
- Genera
  - (Brassicaceae) Jundzillia Andrz. ex DC. Syst. Nat. Candolle 2: 529 1821 (IK), classed as a synonym of Lepidium L.
  - (Stemonitidaceae)Jundzillia Racib. ex L.F.Celak. Arch. Naturwiss. Landesdurchf. Böhmen 7(5): 45. 1893, classed as a synonym of Amaurochaete Rostaf.
- Species
  - (Caryophyllaceae) Silene jundzillii Zapał. Bull. Acad. Cracovie 1911, B 287; Consp. Fl. Galic. Crit. iii 197 (IK)
  - (Rosaceae) Potentilla jundzilliana Błocki ex Th.Wolf Biblioth. Bot. lxxi. III 354 nomen. 1908 (IK)
  - (Rosaceae) Rosa jundzillii Besser Cat. Hort. Cremeneci 1816 117 (IK)
