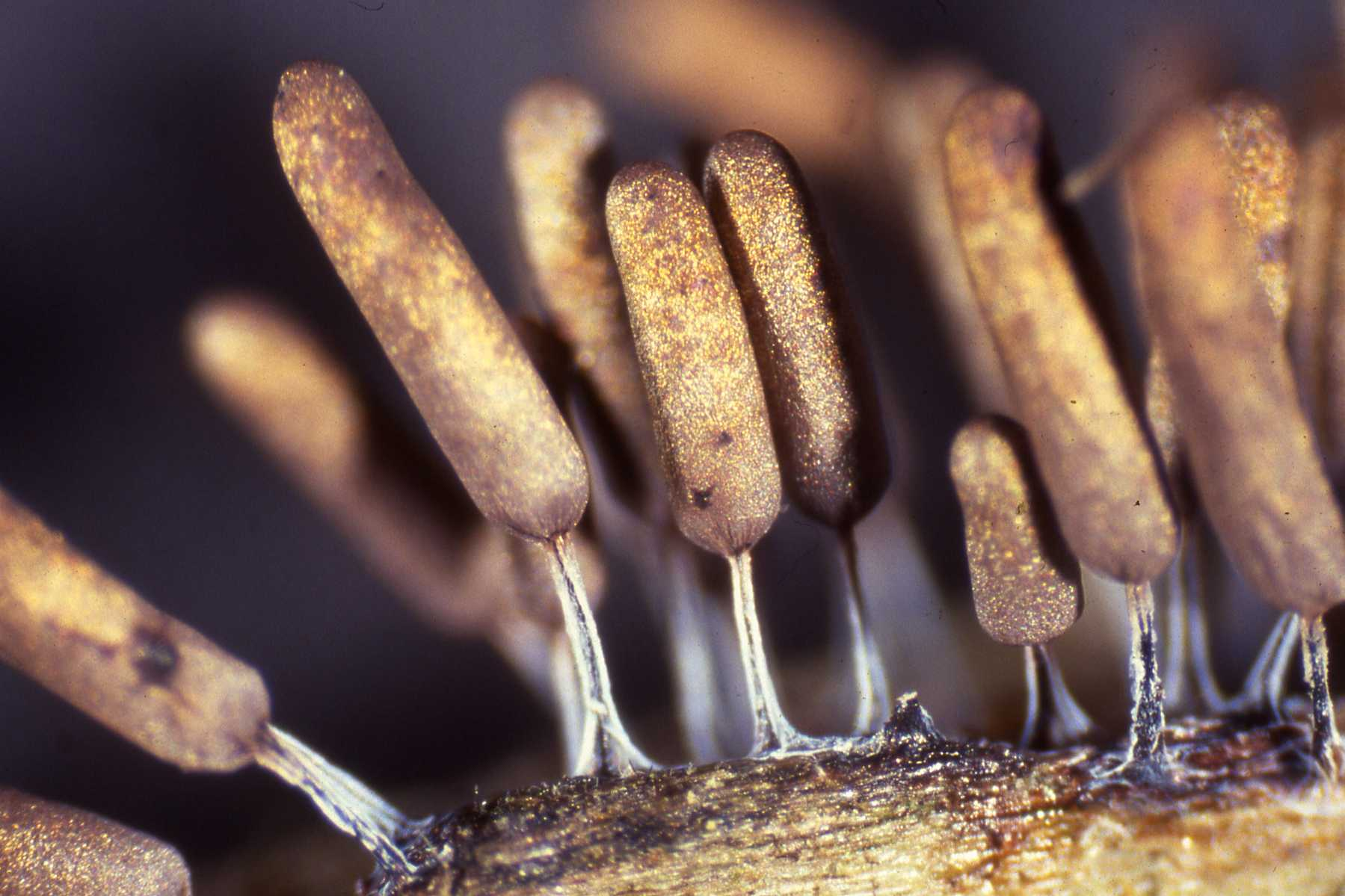
- Stemonitopsis typhina

Scientific classification
- Domain: Eukaryota
- Clade: Amorphea
- Phylum: Amoebozoa
- Class: Myxogastria
- Order: Stemonitidales
- Family: Amaurochaetaceae
- Genus: Stemonitopsis (Nann.-Bremek.) Nann.-Bremek., 1975

Type species
- Stemonitopsis hyperopta (Meyl.) Nann.-Bremek., 1975

Synonyms
- Comatricha subgen. Stemonitopsis Nann.-Bremek., 1967

= Stemonitopsis =

Genus of slime moulds

Stemonitopsis is a genus of slime molds in the family Amaurochaetaceae. First circumscribed by Dutch botanist Elly Nannenga-Bremekamp in 1967 as a subgenus of Comatricha, she later elevated the grouping to generic status in 1975. The type species is Stemonitopsis hyperopta, which was originally described by Charles Meylan in 1919 as Stemonitis hyperopta.

== Species ==
As of June 2016, there are 10 species in the genus.

- Stemonitopsis aequalis
- Stemonitopsis amoena
- Stemonitopsis curiosa
- Stemonitopsis gracilis
- Stemonitopsis hyperopta
- Stemonitopsis microspora
- Stemonitopsis peritricha
- Stemonitopsis reticulata
- Stemonitopsis subcaespitosa
- Stemonitopsis typhina
