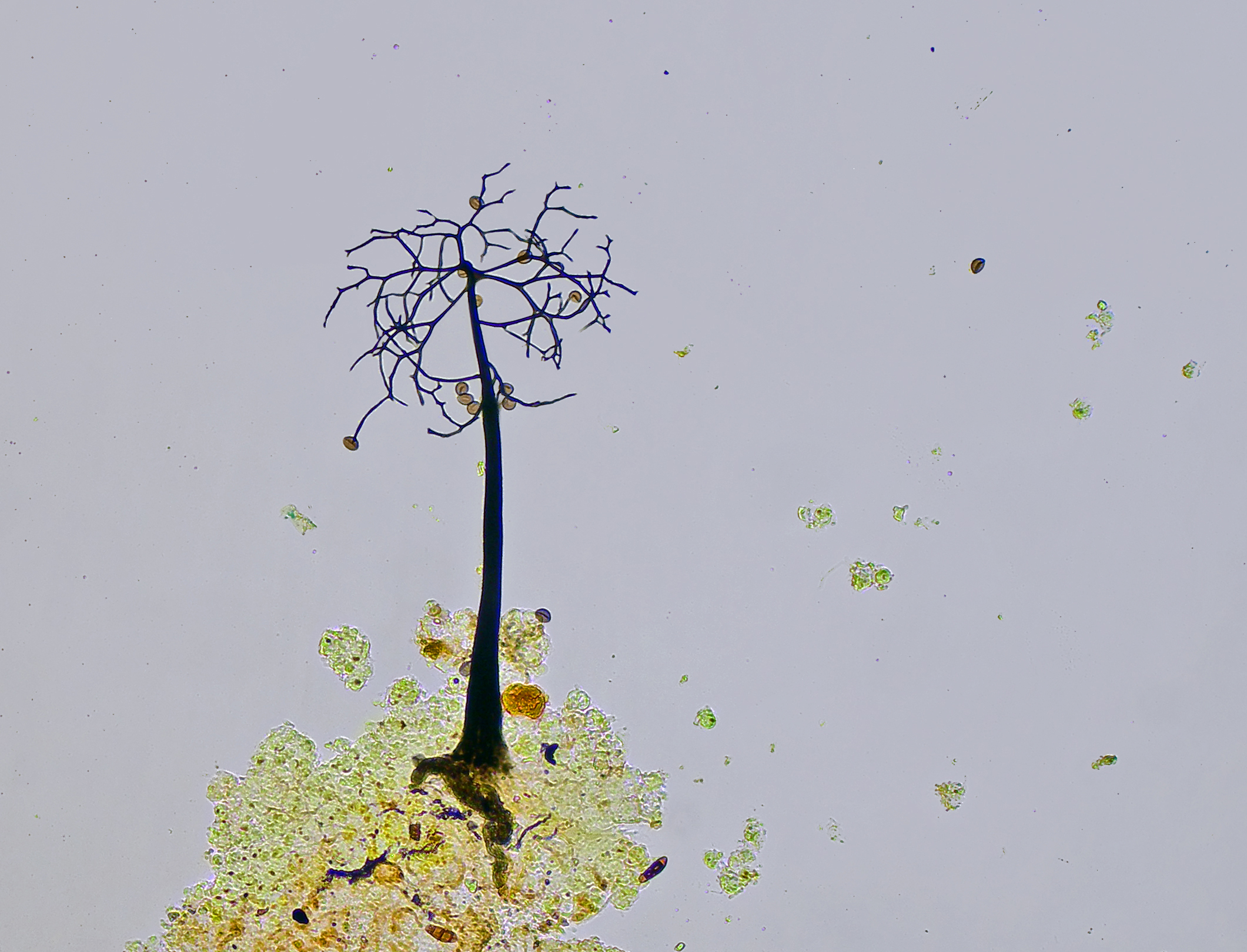
- Paradiacheopsis solitaria

Scientific classification
- Domain: Eukaryota
- Clade: Amorphea
- Phylum: Amoebozoa
- Class: Myxogastria
- Order: Stemonitidales
- Family: Amaurochaetaceae
- Genus: Paradiacheopsis; R.J.G.Hertel

= Paradiacheopsis =

Genus of slime moulds

Paradiacheopsis is a genus of slime molds in the family Amaurochaetaceae. It was first described by Ralph Joao George Hertel in 1954, and the type species is Paradiacheopsis curitibana.
