= Macbrideola =

Scientific classification
- Domain: Eukaryota
- Clade: Amorphea
- Phylum: Amoebozoa
- Class: Myxogastria
- Order: Stemonitidales
- Family: Stemonitidaceae
- Genus: Macbrideola; H.C.Gilbert, 1934

Type species
- Macbrideola scintillans H.C.Gilbert, 1934

Genus of slime moulds

Macbrideola is a genus of Amoebozoa in the family Stemonitidaceae. As of 2015, there are 17 species in the genus.

The genus name of Macbrideola is in honour of Thomas Huston Macbride (1848–1934), who was the tenth president of the University of Iowa and was a naturalist and botanist.

The genus was circumscribed by Henry Clark Gilbert in University of Iowa Studies in Natural History vol.16 on page 155 in 1934.

== Species ==
- Macbrideola andina
- Macbrideola argentea
- Macbrideola confusa
- Macbrideola cornea
- Macbrideola decapillata
- Macbrideola declinata
- Macbrideola dubia
- Macbrideola herrerae
- Macbrideola indica
- Macbrideola lamprodermoides
- Macbrideola macrospora
- Macbrideola martinii
- Macbrideola oblonga
- Macbrideola ovoidea
- Macbrideola reticulospora
- Macbrideola scintillans
- Macbrideola synsporos
