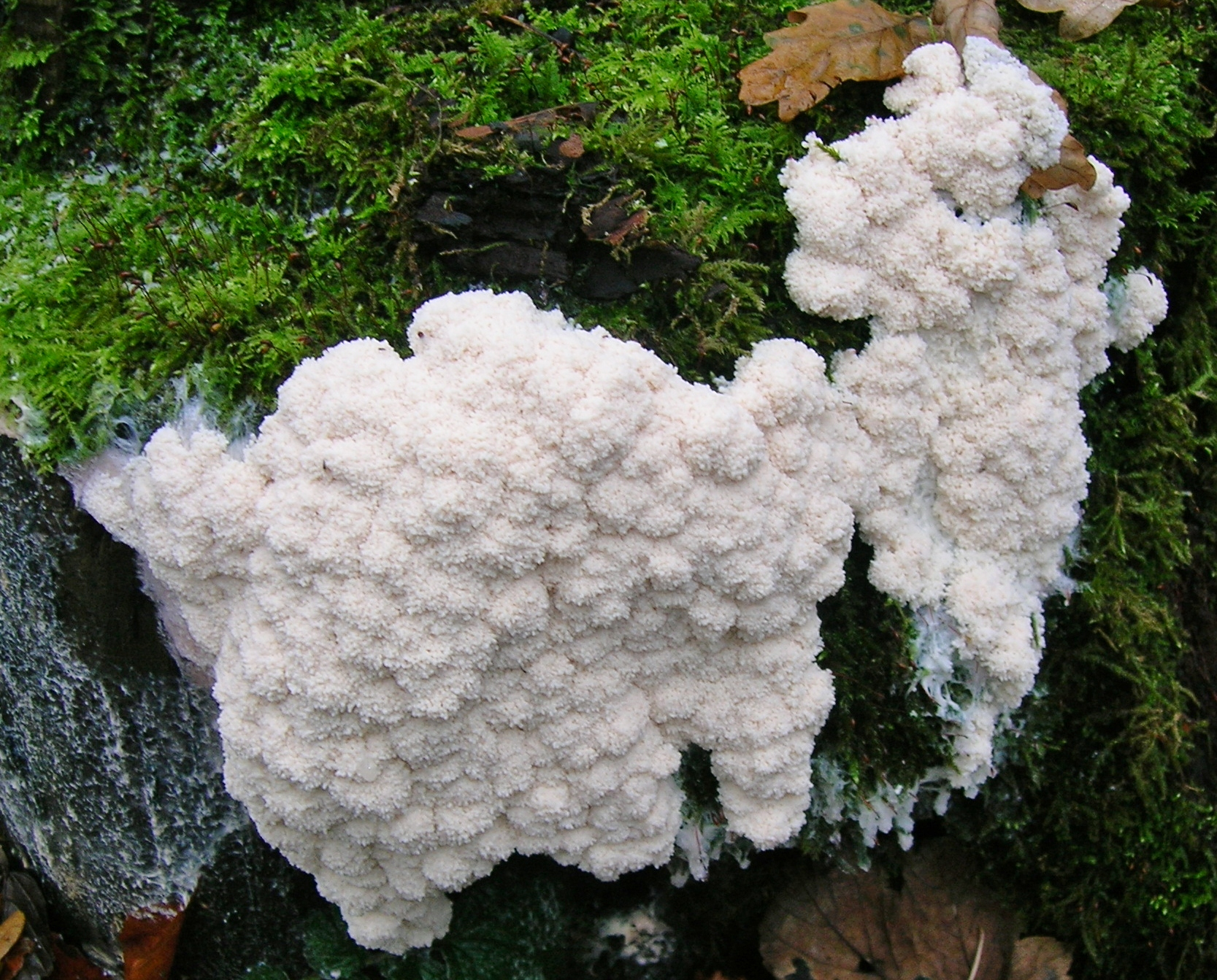
- Brefeldia maxima: plasmodium after 5 days

Scientific classification
- Domain: Eukaryota
- Clade: Amorphea
- Phylum: Amoebozoa
- Class: Myxogastria
- Order: Stemonitidales
- Family: Amaurochaetaceae
- Genus: Brefeldia; Rostaf.

= Brefeldia =

Genus of slime moulds

Brefeldia is a genus of slime molds in the family Amaurochaetaceae.

The genus name of Brefeldia is in honour of Julius Oscar Brefeld (1839 – 1925), a German botanist and mycologist.

The genus was circumscribed by Józef Tomasz Rostafínsky in 1873 and appears to be monotypic, containing the species Brefeldia maxima.
