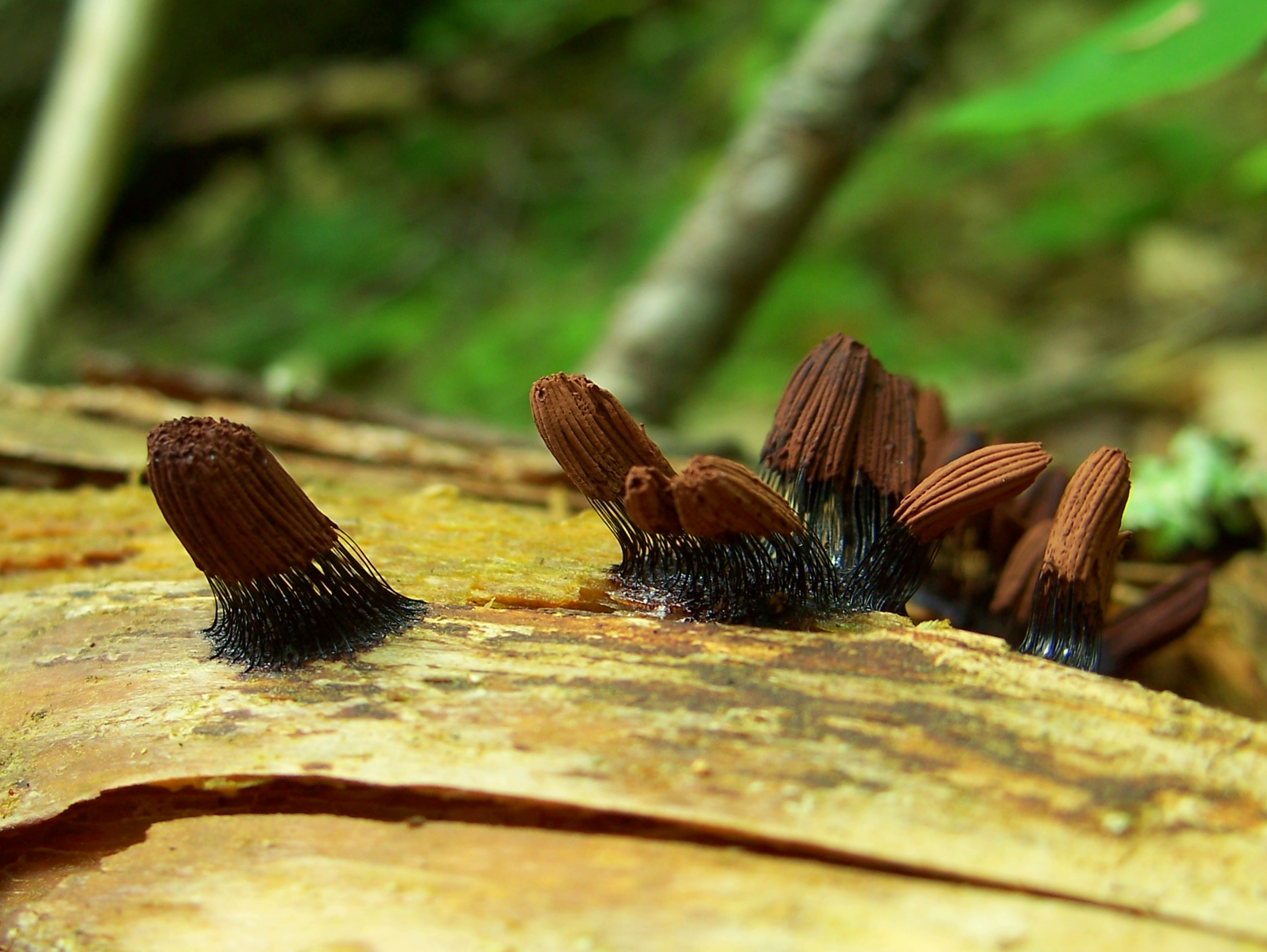
- Fruiting bodies on rotting downed log of Eastern Hemlock (Tsuga canadensis)

Scientific classification
- Domain: Eukaryota
- Phylum: Amoebozoa
- Class: Myxogastria
- Order: Stemonitidales
- Family: Stemonitidaceae
- Genus: Stemonitis
- Species: S. fusca

Binomial name
- Stemonitis fusca Roth, 1787

= Stemonitis fusca =

Species of slime mould

Stemonitis fusca is a species of slime mold. It fruits in clusters on dead wood and has distinctive tall brown sporangia supported on slender stalks with a total height of approximately 6–20 mm tall.

== Subspecies ==
Stemonitis fusca var. rufescens, Lister 1894
