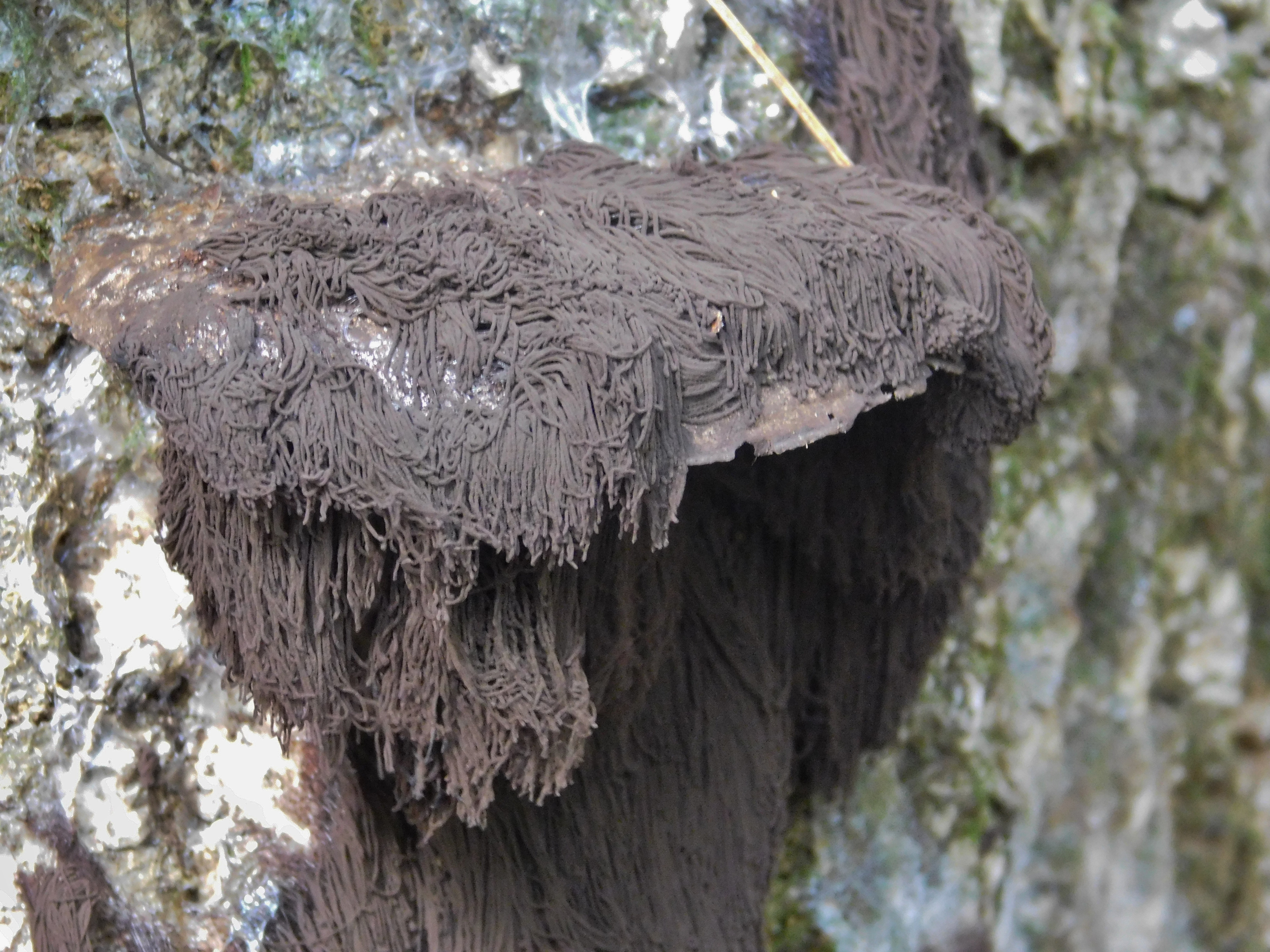
- Stemonaria longa in Buffam Falls Conservation Area, Pelham, Massachusetts, USA

Scientific classification
- Domain: Eukaryota
- Clade: Amorphea
- Phylum: Amoebozoa
- Class: Myxogastria
- Order: Stemonitidales
- Family: Amaurochaetaceae
- Genus: Stemonaria; Nann.-Bremek., R.Sharma & Y.Yamam. 1984

Type species
- Stemonaria fuscoides Nann.-Bremek. & Y.Yamam. 1984

= Stemonaria =

Genus of slime moulds

Stemonaria is a genus of slime molds in the family Amaurochaetaceae. As of June 2015, there are 14 species in the genus.

== Species ==
- Stemonaria argentella
- Stemonaria clausifila
- Stemonaria fuscoides
- Stemonaria gracilis
- Stemonaria irregularis
- Stemonaria laxa
- Stemonaria laxiretis
- Stemonaria longa
- Stemonaria minuta
- Stemonaria nannengae
- Stemonaria pallidofila
- Stemonaria pilosa
- Stemonaria reticulospora
- Stemonaria rufipes
