= Julius Oscar Brefeld =

German botanist and mycologist

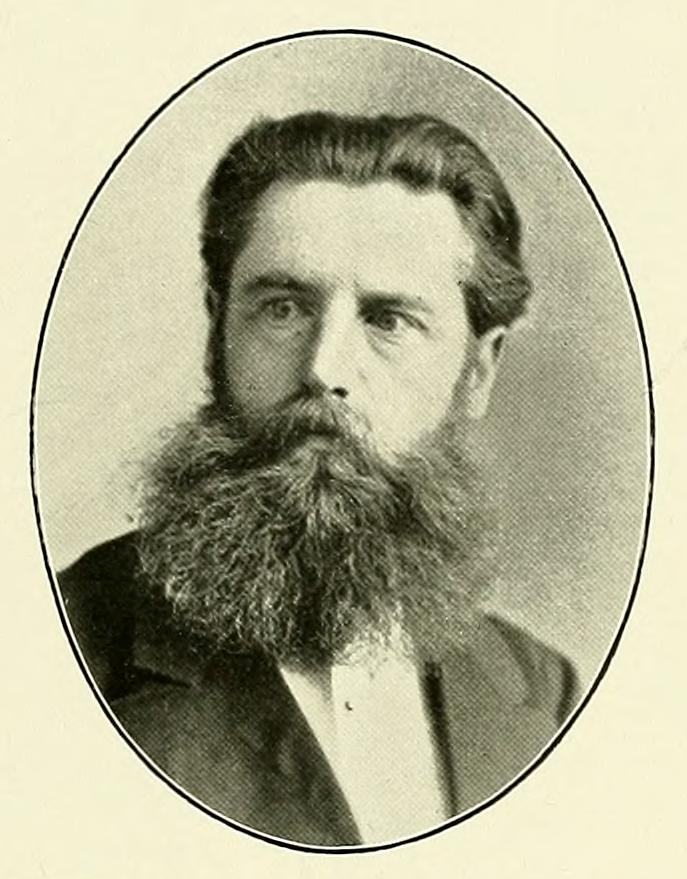
Oscar Brefeld (1839–1925)

Julius Oscar Brefeld (19 August 1839 – 12 January 1925), usually just Oscar Brefeld, was a German botanist and mycologist.

== Biography ==
Brefeld was a native of Telgte. He studied pharmacy in Heidelberg and Berlin, and afterwards served as an assistant to Anton de Bary (1831–1888) at the University of Halle. In 1878 he became a lecturer of botany at the Eberswalde Forestry Academy at Eberswalde, and in 1882 was a professor of botany at the University of Münster, as well as manager of its botanical gardens. In 1898 he succeeded Ferdinand Cohn (1828–1898) as professor at the University of Breslau. In 1898 Brefeld was stricken by glaucoma, and subsequently became totally blind. His eye problems caused him to retire from the university in 1909.

Brefeld was a prolific author of works in the field of mycology, being remembered for his writings on the heteroecious nature of fungal rusts and smuts. He pioneered culture techniques in the growth of fungi (using gelatin as a solid media), and in doing so, was able to study the life histories and systematic relationships of different groups of fungi. He is credited with providing nomenclature for a number of genera and species of fungi. The names Conidiobolus, Heterobasidion, Oligoporus and Polysphondylium (genus of slime mold) are a few of genera that he described. He is remembered for his disagreements with Anton de Bary in regards to the nature of yeasts as well as to the sexual nature of fungi (Brefeld maintained that higher fungi were devoid of sexuality).

The genus Brefeldia from the family Amaurochaetaceae, was named after him in 1873.

Every two years, the Deutschen Gesellschaft für Mykologie offers the "Oscar-Brefeld-Preis" to young scientists for work in the field of mycology.

== Selected writings ==
- 1981 - 1881: Botanische Untersuchungen über Schimmelpilze (Botanical investigations into molds).
- 1874: Botanische Untersuchungen über Schimmelpilze: Die Entwicklungsgeschichte von Penicillium; (Botanical studies on mold: The history of penicillium).
- 1877: Botanische Untersuchungen über Schimmelpilze: Basidiomyceten, (Botanical studies on mold: Basidiomycetes).
- 1881: Botanische Untersuchungen über Hefenpilze: Die Brandpilze, (Botanical studies of yeast fungi: The Rusts).
- 1883: Botanische Untersuchungen über Hefenpilze. (Botanical studies of yeast fungi).
- 1884 - 1912: Untersuchungen aus dem Gesammtgebiete der Mykologie (Examinations from the field of mycology) - 15 volumes.
- 1888: Untersuchungen aus dem Gesammtgebiete der Mykologie: Basidiomyceten II: Protobasidiomyceten Studies (Research of the field of mycology: Basidiomycetes II: Protobasidiomycetes).
- 1889: Untersuchungen aus dem Gesammtgebiete der Mykologie: Basidiomyceten III: Autobasidiomyceten und die Begründung des natürlichen Systemes der Pilze - (Studies from the field of mycology: Basidiomycetes III: Autobasidiomycetes and the foundation of a natural taxonomic system of the mushroom).
- 1895: Untersuchungen aus dem Gesammtgebiete der Mykologie: Hemibasidii: Brnadpilze III (Studies from the field of mycology: Hemibasidii: - Rusts III).
- 1895: Untersuchungen aus dem Gesammtgebiete der Mykologie: Die Brandpilze II (Studies from the field of mycology: The Rusts II).
- 1905: Untersuchungen aus dem Gesammtgebiete der Mykologie: Brandpilze (Hemibasidii) IV (Studies from the field of mycology: The Rusts (Hemibasidii IV).
- 1912: Untersuchungen aus dem Gesammtgebiete der Mykologie: Die Brandpilze V (Studies from the field of mycology: The Rusts V).

== See also ==
- Category:Taxa named by Julius Oscar Brefeld
