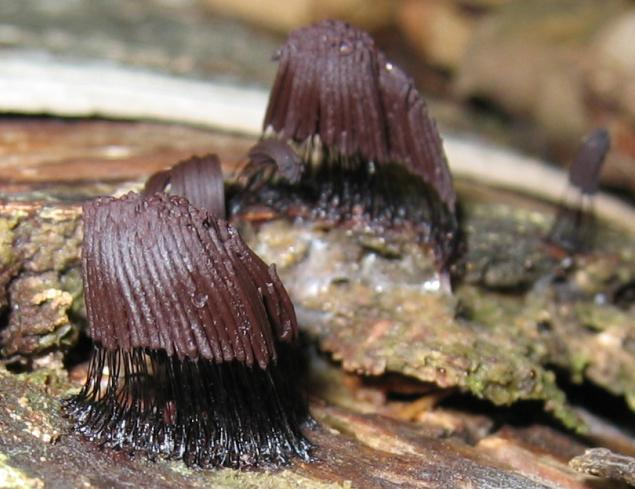
- Stemonitis fusca or similar species in the White Mountain National Forest

Scientific classification
- Domain: Eukaryota
- Phylum: Amoebozoa
- Class: Myxogastria
- Order: Stemonitidales
- Family: Stemonitidaceae
- Genus: Stemonitis; Gled.

Type species
- Stemonitis fusca Roth in Roemer & Usteri (1787)

= Stemonitis =

Stemonitis Temporal range: Cenomanian–Present

Genus of slime moulds

Stemonitis is a distinctive genus of slime moulds found throughout the world (except Antarctica). They are characterised by the tall brown sporangia, supported on slender stalks, which grow in clusters on rotting wood. The genus was first described by German botanist Johann Gottlieb Gleditsch in 1753. A 2014 estimate suggests that there are 18 species in the genus. Identification within the genus is difficult, and can only be performed with confidence using a microscope or by DNA sequencing. A fossil specimen (in Burmese amber) is known from the mid-Cretaceous (99 ma).

== Species ==
The following species are accepted by Species Fungorum:

- Stemonitis axifera (Bull.) T.Macbr. (1889)
- Stemonitis farrensis T. N. Lakh. & Mukerji (1977)
- Stemonitis ferruginea Ehrenb. (1818)
- Stemonitis flavogenita E. Jahn (1904)
- Stemonitis foliicola Ing (1967)
- Stemonitis fusca Roth (1787)
- Stemonitis graciliformis Nann.-Bremek., Mukerji & Pasricha (1984)
- Stemonitis herbatica Peck (1874)
- Stemonitis inconspicua Nann.-Bremek. (1966)
- Stemonitis laxifila Nann.-Bremek. & Y. Yamam. (1988)
- Stemonitis lignicola Nann.-Bremek. (1973)
- Stemonitis marjana Y. Yamam. (2000)
- Stemonitis mediterraneensis H.H. Doğan & Eroğlu (2014)
- Stemonitis mussooriensis G. W. Martin, K. S. Thind & Sohi (1957)
- Stemonitis nigrescens Rex (1891)
- Stemonitis pallida Wingate (1899)
- Stemonitis rhizoideipes Nann.-Bremek., R. Sharma & K. S. Thind (1984)
- Stemonitis smithii T.Macbr. (1893)
- Stemonitis splendens Rostaf. (1875)
- Stemonitis virginiensis Rex (1891)
