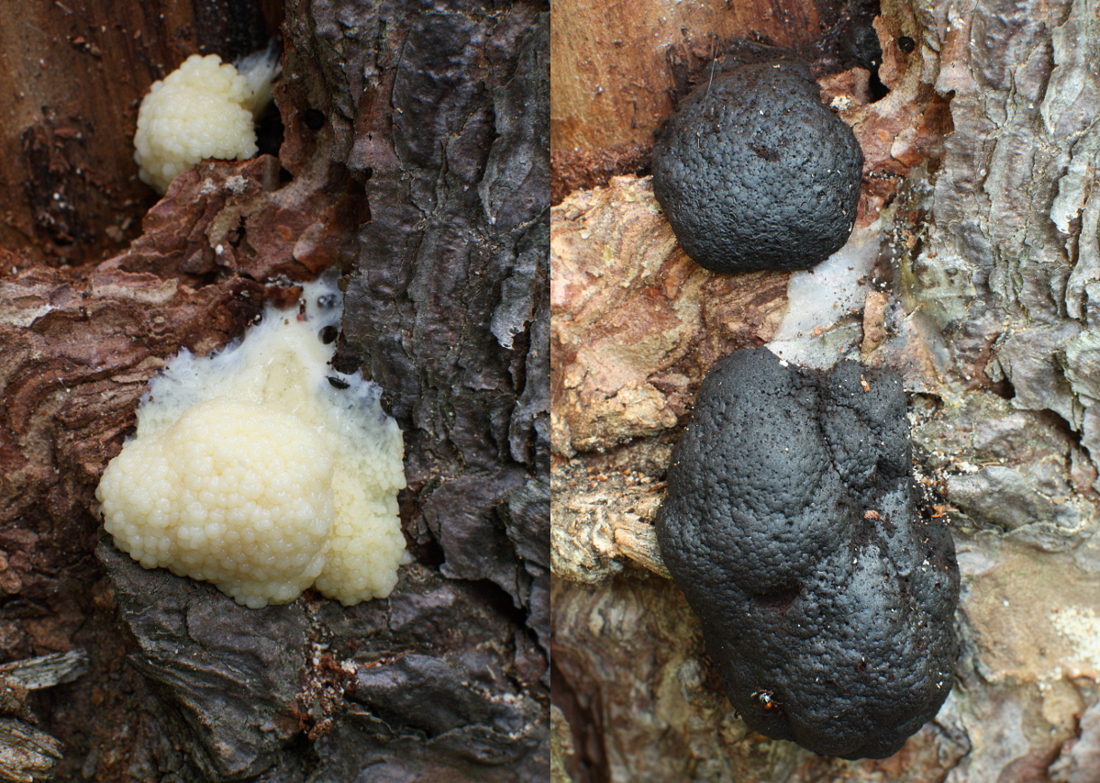
- Plasmodium (left) and aethalium (right) of Amaurochaete slime mold.

Scientific classification
- Domain: Eukaryota
- Clade: Amorphea
- Phylum: Amoebozoa
- Class: Myxogastria
- Order: Stemonitidales
- Family: Amaurochaetaceae
- Genus: Amaurochaete; Rostaf., 1873

Type species
- Amaurochaete atra (Alb. & Schwein.) Rostaf., 1875

Synonyms
- Lachnobolus Fr., (1825); Jundzillia Racib. [as 'Iundzillia'] 1887; Jundzillia Racib. ex L.F.Čelak., 1893; Matruchotia Skup. (1924); Matruchotiella Skup. ex G.Lister, 1925

= Amaurochaete =

Genus of slime moulds

Amaurochaete is a genus of slime molds in the family Amaurochaetaceae. As of 2015, there are four species in the genus.
