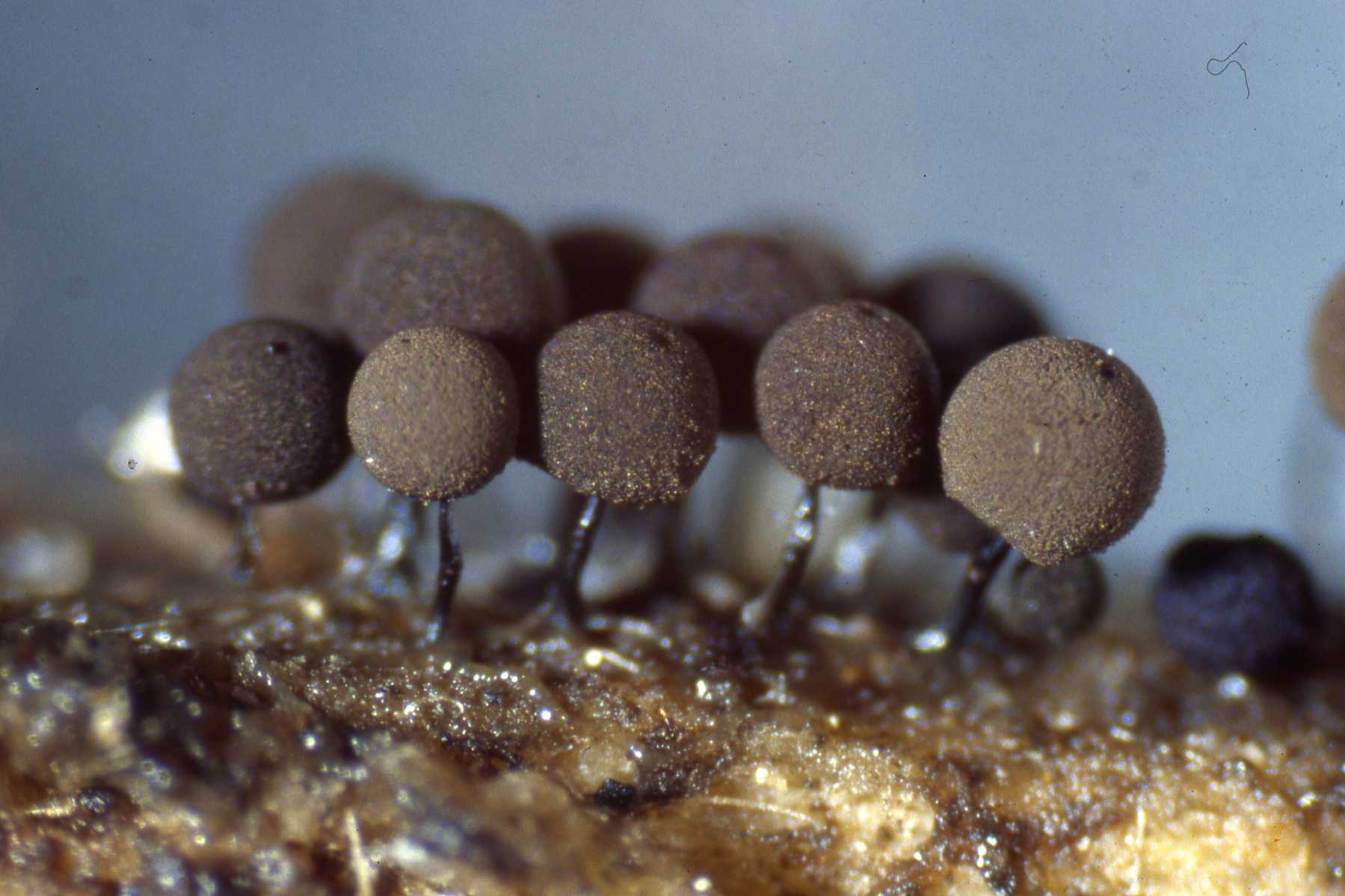
- Mature fruiting bodies of Enerthenema papillatum

Scientific classification
- Domain: Eukaryota
- Clade: Amorphea
- Phylum: Amoebozoa
- Class: Myxogastria
- Order: Stemonitidales
- Family: Amaurochaetaceae
- Genus: Enerthenema; Bowman, 1830

Type species
- Enerthenema elegans Berk. & Broome, 1848

Species
- Enerthenema berkeleyanum; Enerthenema intermedium; Enerthenema melanospermum; Enerthenema papillatum

Synonyms
- Ancyrophorus Raunk., 1888

= Enerthenema =

Genus of slime moulds

Enerthenema is a genus of slime molds in the family Amaurochaetaceae. As of 2015, there are four species in the genus.
