= Myxogastromycetidae =

Scientific classification
- Domain: Eukaryota
- Phylum: Amoebozoa
- Class: Myxogastria
- Subclass: Myxogastromycetidae

Subclass of slime moulds

Myxogastromycetidae is a subclass of Myxogastria. It can be divided into the orders Echinostelida and Physarida.
