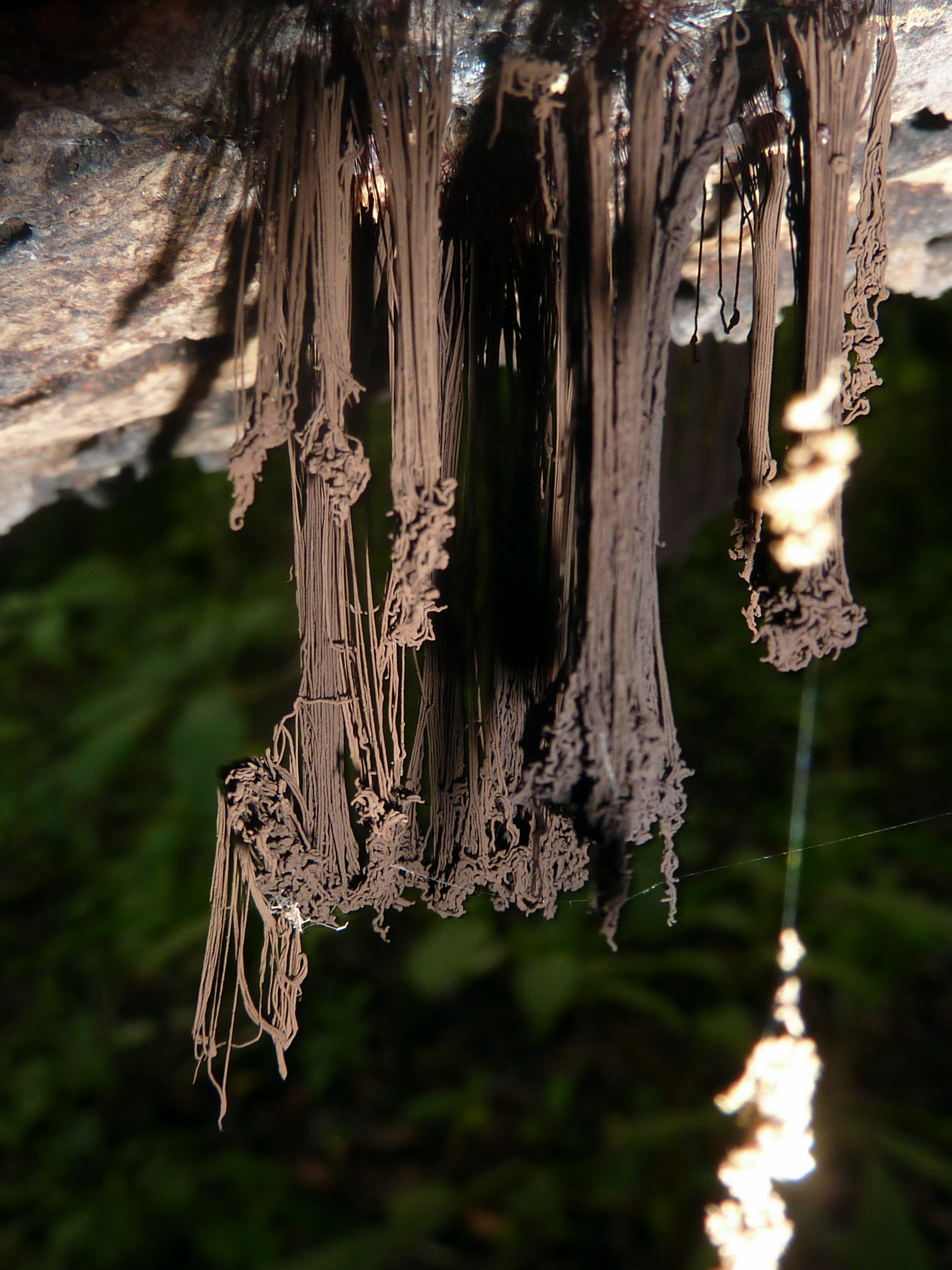
- Stemonaria longa in La Chorrera, Panama

Scientific classification
- Domain: Eukaryota
- Phylum: Amoebozoa
- Class: Myxogastria
- Order: Stemonitidales
- Family: Amaurochaetaceae; Rostaf. ex Cooke

Genera
- See text

= Amaurochaetaceae =

Family of slime moulds

Amaurochaetaceae is a family of slime molds in the order Stemonitidales.

== Genera ==
- Amaurochaete
- Brefeldia
- Comatricha
- Enerthenema
- Stemonaria
- Stemonitopsis
- Paradiacheopsis
