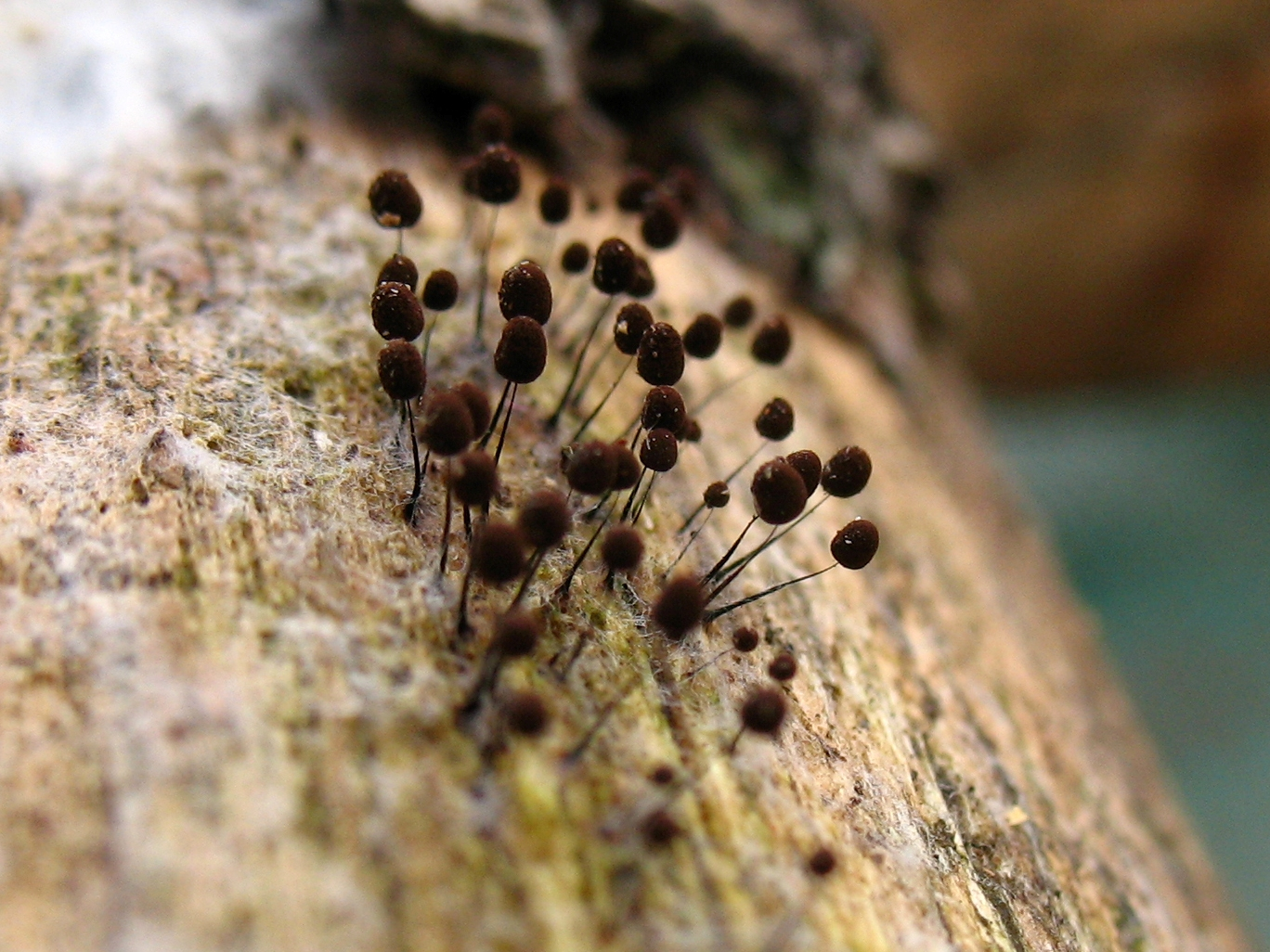
- Comatricha nigra

Scientific classification
- Domain: Eukaryota
- Clade: Amorphea
- Phylum: Amoebozoa
- Class: Myxogastria
- Order: Stemonitidales
- Family: Amaurochaetaceae
- Genus: Comatricha; Preuss, 1851

Type species
- Comatricha obtusata (Fr. & Palmquist) Preuss

Synonyms
- Raciborskia Berl., 1888; Comatrichoides Hertel, 1956; Paradiaches Hertel, 1956; Collaria Nann.-Bremek, 1967

= Comatricha =

Genus of slime moulds

Comatricha is a genus of slime molds in the family Amaurochaetaceae. As of 2015, Index Fungorum includes 39 species in the genus.

== Species ==
- Comatricha afroalpina
- Comatricha aggregata
- Comatricha alta
- Comatricha anomala
- Comatricha brachypus
- Comatricha calderaensis
- Comatricha ellae
- Comatricha filamentosa
- Comatricha fragilis
- Comatricha fusiformis
- Comatricha kowalskii
- Comatricha laxa
- Comatricha laxifila
- Comatricha longipila
- Comatricha meandrispora
- Comatricha mirabilis
- Comatricha nigra
- Comatricha nivalis
- Comatricha nodulifera
- Comatricha nutans
- Comatricha orthotricha
- Comatricha parvispora
- Comatricha pellucida
- Comatricha pseudoalpina
- Comatricha pseudonigra
- Comatricha pulchella
- Comatricha pulchelloides
- Comatricha reticulospora
- Comatricha retispora
- Comatricha rigidireta
- Comatricha robusta
- Comatricha rutilipedata
- Comatricha sinuatocolumellata
- Comatricha subalpina
- Comatricha suksdorfii
- Comatricha tenerrima
- Comatricha variabilis
- Comatricha vineatilis

Names brought to synonymy

- Comatricha elegans (Racib.) Lister 1909 is a synonym of Collaria elegans.
