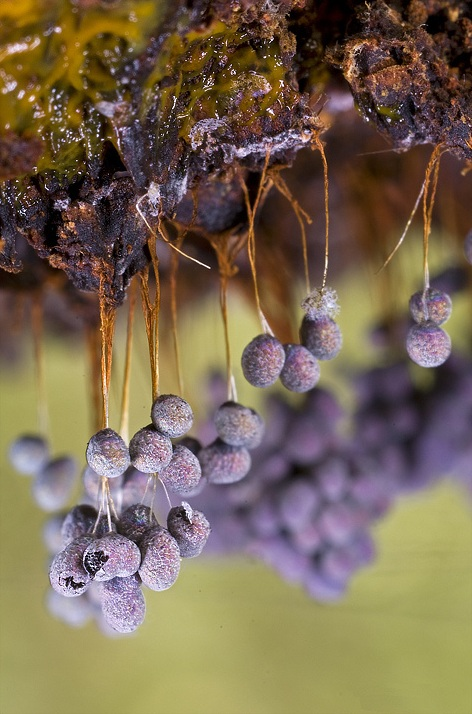
- Badhamia utricularis (Physarales)

Scientific classification
- Domain: Eukaryota
- Supergroup: Amorphea
- Phylum: Amoebozoa
- Infraphylum: Eumycetozoa
- Class: Myxogastria; T. Macbr. (1899)

Orders
- Cribrariales; Reticulariales; Liceales; Trichiales; Echinosteliopsidales; Echinosteliales; Clastodermatales; Meridermatales; Stemonitales; Physarales

Synonyms
- Myxomycota sensu Alexopoulos et al. (1996); Myxomycetes Link (1833), sensu Webster & Weber (2007)

= Myxogastria =

Group of slime molds

Myxogastria/Myxogastrea (myxogastrids, ICZN) or Myxomycetes (ICN) is a class of slime molds that contains 5 orders, 14 families, 62 genera, and 888 species. They are colloquially known as the plasmodial or acellular slime molds.

All Myxogastria species pass through several very different morphologic phases, such as microscopic individual cells, slimy amorphous organisms visible with the naked eye, and conspicuously shaped fruit bodies. Although they are monocellular, in extreme cases they can be up to 1 metre (3 ft 3 in) across and weigh up to 20 kilograms (44 lb).

The class Myxogastria is distributed worldwide, but it is more common in temperate regions where it has a higher biodiversity than in polar regions, the subtropics, or the tropics. They are mainly found in open forests, but also in extreme regions such as deserts, under snow blankets, or underwater. They also occur on the bark of trees, sometimes high in the canopy. These are known as corticolous myxomycetes. Most species are very small.

== Taxonomy and classification ==
=== Nomenclature ===
Myxomycota, now considered a synonym of Myxogastria, comes from the Ancient Greek words μύξα myxa, which means "mucus", and μύκης mykes, which means "fungus". The name Myxogastria was introduced in 1970 by Lindsay Shepherd Olive to describe the family Myxogastridae, which was introduced in 1899 by Thomas Huston Macbride. Swedish mycologist Elias Magnus Fries described numerous slime moulds as Myxogasteres in 1829. Species in the class Myxogastria are colloquially known as plasmodial or acellular slime moulds. Some consider the Myxogastria a separate kingdom, with an unsettled phylogeny because of conflicting molecular and developmental data. The relations among myxogastrid orders are as yet unclear.

=== Range ===
The continuous classification of new taxa reveals that the class is not fully described. According to a 2000 inquiry, there were 1012 officially accepted taxa, including 866 on species level. Another study in 2007 stated a number of more than 1000, in which the Myxogastria comprised the biggest group of slime moulds, with over 900 species. On the basis of sequenced environmental samples it is estimated that the group has between 1200 and 1500 species – more than previously estimated. Among the 1012 taxa only a few species are common: 305 species were discovered in a single location or groupings, a further 258 species were found in a few areas between 2–20 times, and only 446 were common in several locations with over 20 discoveries.

Reclassifications encounter problems because the Myxogastriae are morphologically very plastic, which is to say susceptible to environmental influences; only a few characteristics are diagnostic for a small number of species. In the past, authors have unsuccessfully tried to describe a new taxon based on a small number of examples, but this leads to numerous duplications, sometimes even at genus level. For example, Squamuloderma nullifila is actually a species from the genus Didymium.

=== Classification and phylogeny ===
Traditional classification

- Myxogastria
  - Echinosteliida
  - - Dark‑spored clade
      - Stemonitida
      - Physarida
    - Clear‑spored clade
      - Liceida
      - Trichiida

This is a traditional classification based on Lister and Lister, made in the early 20th century. Molecular genetical studies confirm and stabilise this classification. The most basal group is Echinosteliida. Other groups further contain two superclades, which are morphologically definable by spore colour.

Molecular classification

- - Lucisporomycetidae
    - Cribrarianae
      Cribrariales
    - Trichianae
      - Reticulariales
      - - Liceida
        - Trichiida
  - Columellomycetidae
    - Echinostelianae
      Echinosteliida
    - Stemonitanae
      - Clastodermatales
      - - Meridermatales
        - - Stemonitales
          - Physarales

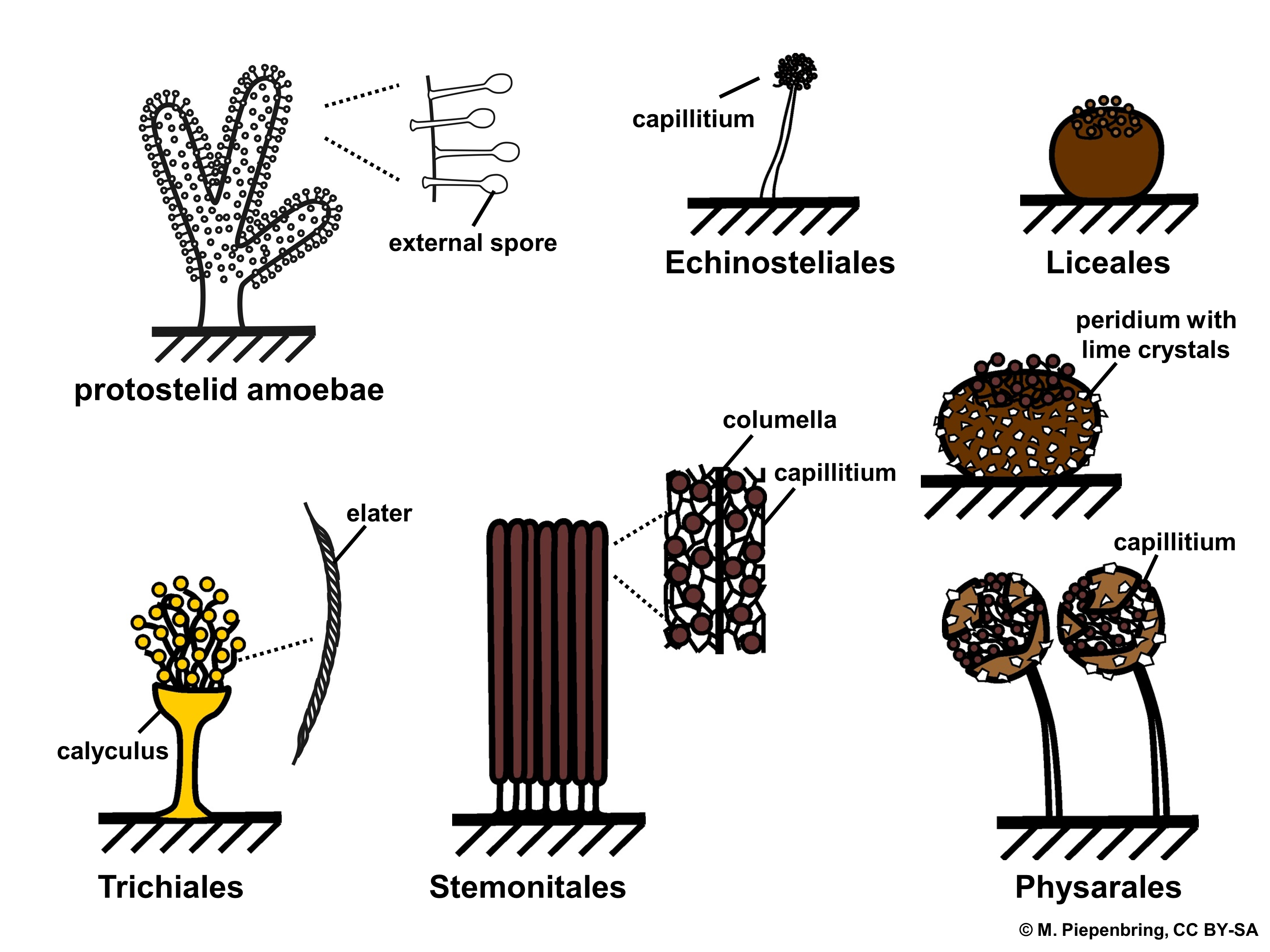
Sporangia types in the protostelids and in the myxogastrid groups (Echinosteliales, Liceales, Trichiales, Stemonitales, Physarales)

The following classification is based on a 2019 publication by Leontyev and coauthors, which revised the systematics of myxomycetes by integrating molecular phylogenetics with morphological traits. Myxomycetes are a class divided into two subclasses, Lucisporomycetidae and Columellomycetidae, respectively representing the bright-spored and dark-spored clades. In total, myxomycetes comprise 13 families and nine orders.

- Class Myxomycetes G. Winter 1880
  - Subclass Lucisporomycetidae Leontyev et al. 2019 (bright‑spored acellular slime moulds)
    - Superorder Cribrarianae Leontyev 2015
      - Order Cribrariales Macbride 1922
        - Family Cribrariaceae Rostafinski 1873
    - Superorder Trichianae Leontyev 2015
      - Order Reticulariales Leontyev 2015
        - Family Reticulariaceae Rostafinski 1873
      - Order Liceales Jahn 1928
        - Family Liceaceae Rostafinski 1873
      - Order Trichiales Macbride 1922
        - Family Dianemataceae Macbride 1899
        - Family Trichiaceae Rostafinski 1826
  - Subclass Collumellidia Leontyev et al. 2019 (dark‑spored acellular slime moulds)
    - Order Echinosteliopsidales Shchepin et al.
      - Family Echinosteliopsidaceae Olive 1970
    - Superorder Echinostelianae Leontyev 2015
      - Order Echinosteliales Martin 1961
        - Family Echinosteliaceae Rostafinski ex Cooke 1877
    - Superorder Stemonitanae Leontyev 2015
      - Order Clastodermatales Leontyev et al. 2019
        - Family Clastodermataceae Alexopoulos & Brooks 1971
      - Order Meridermatales Leontyev 2015
        - Family Meridermataceae Leontyev 2015
      - Order Stemonitales Macbride 1922
        - Family Comatrichaceae Leontyev 2015
        - Family Stemonitidaceae Fries 1829
      - Order Physarales Macbride 1922
        - Family Didymiaceae Rostafinski ex Cooke 1877
        - Family Lamprodermataceae Leontyev 2015
        - Family Physaraceae Chevallier 1826

Some classifications place part of the orders above in the subclass Myxogastromycetidae.

== Characteristics and life cycle ==
=== Monocellular, mononuclear phase ===
==== Spores ====
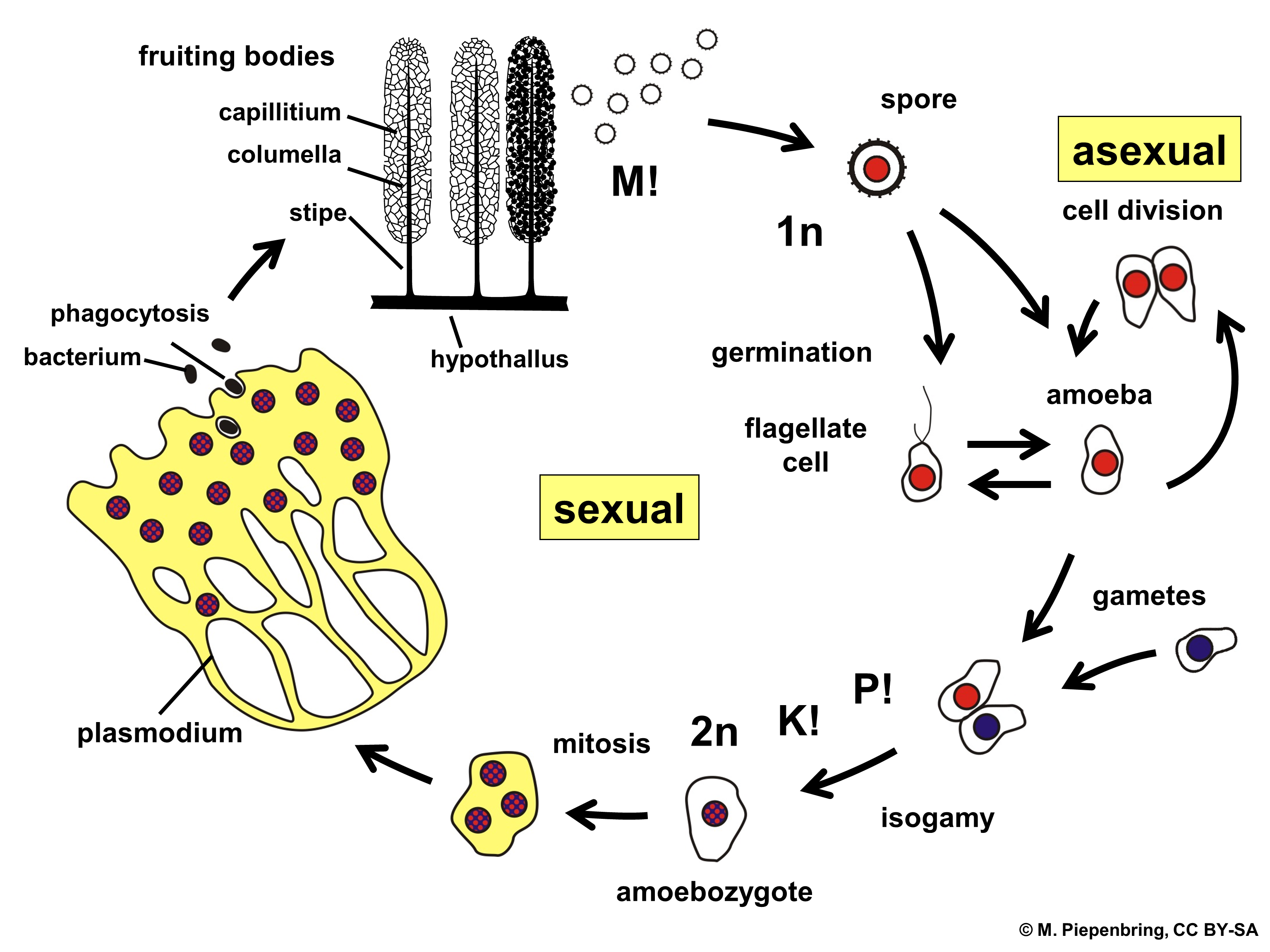
Life cycle of Stemonitis sp. (Stemonitales)

The spores of Myxogastria are haploid, mainly round and measure between 5 μm and 20 μm, rarely up to 24 μm in diameter. Their surface is generally reticular, sharp, warty or spiky and very rarely smooth. The typical colour of the spore mass becomes visible through the structure, since the spores themselves are not pigmented. In some species, especially of the genus Badhamia, the spores produce lumps. The colour, shape and diameter of spores are important characteristics for identifying species.

Important factors for the germination of spores are mainly moisture and temperature. The spores usually remain germinable after several years; there were even spores preserved in herbarium specimens which germinated after 75 years. After the spores' development, they first receive a diploid nucleus, and the meiosis takes place in the spore. At the germination, the spore shells open either alongside special germinal pores or chinks, or rip irregularly and then release one to four haploid protoplasts.

==== Myxamoebae and Myxoflagellates ====
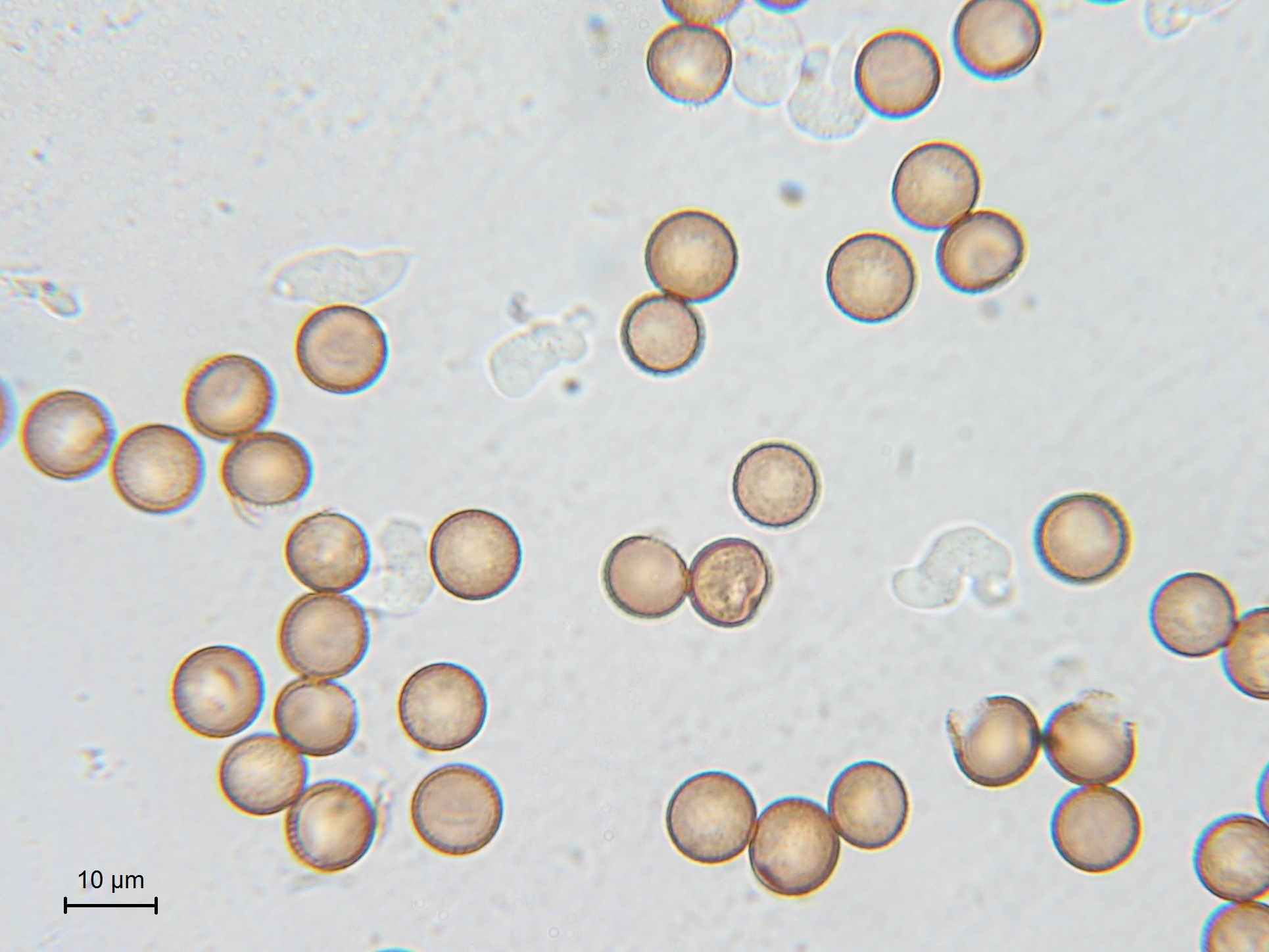
Budded myxoflagellates of Symphytocarpus flaccidus (Stemonitales) and opened spores

In those species which reproduce sexually, haploid cells bud from the spores. Depending on the environmental conditions, either a myxamoeba or a myxoflagellate buds from the spore. Myxamoebae move like amoebae – that is, crawling on the substrate – and are produced in dry conditions. Myxoflagellates, which can swim, develop in moist to wet environments. Myxoflagellates almost always have two flagella; one is generally shorter than the other and sometimes only vestigial. The flagella are used for locomotion and to help to move food particles closer. If the humidity changes, cells can switch between the two manifestations. Neither form has a cell wall. This developmental stage (and the next one) serves as a nourishment provider and is also known as the first trophic phase (nourishment phase). In this monocellular phase, the Myxogastria consume bacteria and fungus spores, and probably dissolved substances, and they reproduce through simple cell division. If the environmental conditions change adversely in this phase, for example extreme temperature, extreme dryness or food shortage, the Myxogastria may switch to very long-lived, thin-shelled quiescent states – the so-called microcysts. For that to happen, the myxamoebae assume a round shape and secrete a thin cell wall. In this state they can easily survive one year or longer. If living conditions improve, they become active again.

Representation of a Myxogastrid: 1. Anterior flagellum; 2. Posterior flagellum; 3. Basal body; 4. Microtubular cone; 5. Golgi apparatus; modifies proteins and sends them out of the cell; 6. Nucleus; 7. Nucleolus; 8. Mitochondrion, creates ATP (energy) for the cell (flat cristae); 9. Endoplasmic reticulum, the transport network for molecules going to specific parts of the cell; 10. Contractile vacuole, regulates the quantity of water inside a cell; 11. Lysosome, holds enzymes; 12. Food vacuole; 13. Lipid body; 14. Endoplasm; 15. Ectoplasm

==== Zygogenesis ====
If two cells of the same type meet in this phase, they cross-fertilise to a diploid zygote through the fusion of protoplasms and nuclei. The conditions which trigger this are not known. The diploid zygote becomes a multinucleated plasmodium through multiple nuclear divisions without further cell division. If the resulting cells were peritrichous, they change their shape before the fusion from the peritrichous form to the myxamoeba. The production of a zygote requires two cells of different mating types (heterothallic).

=== Plasmodium ===
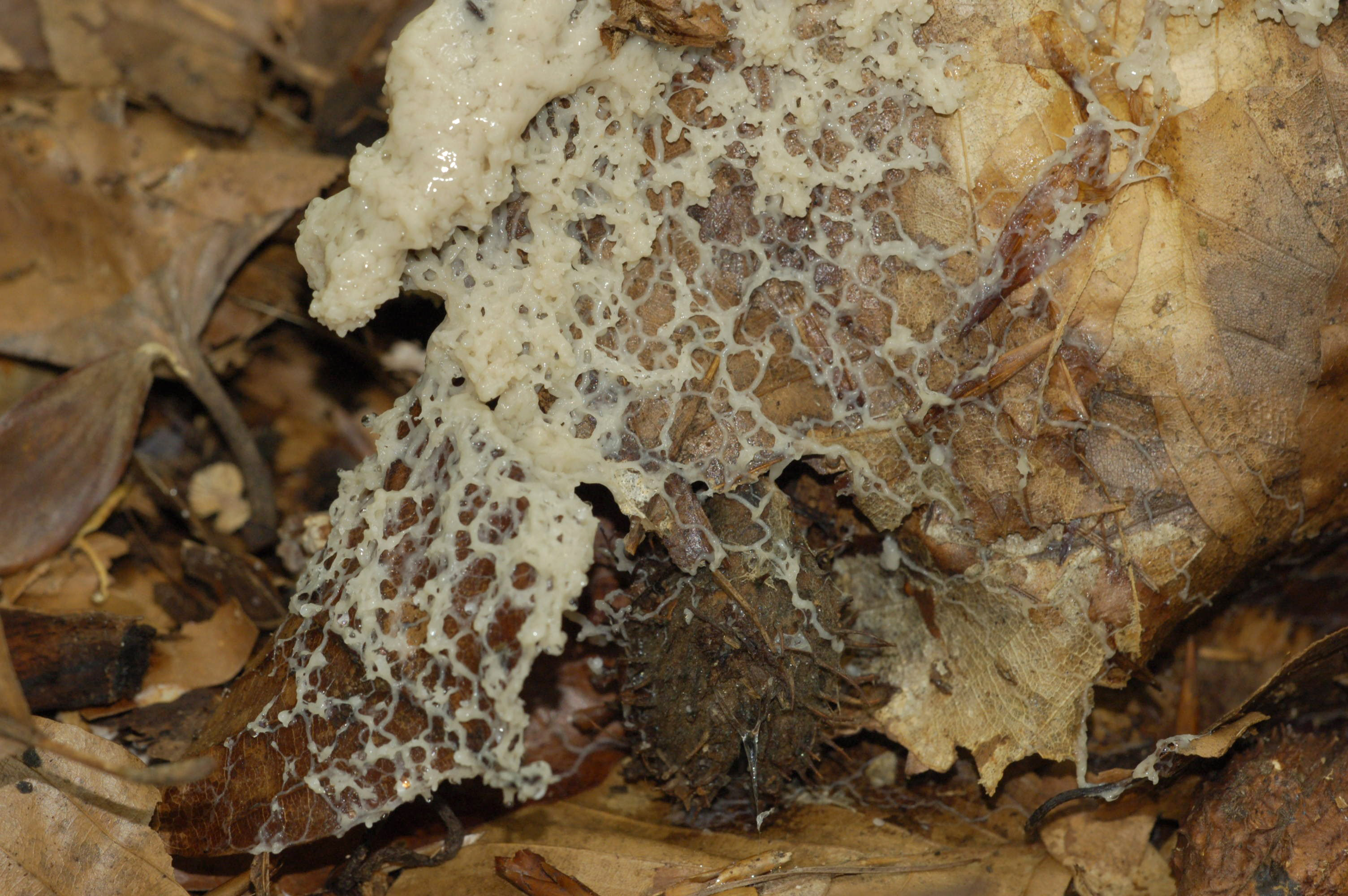
Plasmodium in transition to a fruit body

The second trophic phase begins with the development of the plasmodium. The multinucleated organism now absorbs via phagocytosis as many nutrients as possible. These are bacteria, protists, dissolved substances, moulds, higher fungi and small particles of organic material. This enables the cell to undergo enormous growth. The nucleus divides multiple times, and the cell soon becomes visible to the naked eye and usually has a surface area – depending on the species – up to one square metre; however, in 1987 one artificially cultivated cell of Physarum polycephalum attained a surface area of 5.5 sq m. Myxogastria species have numerous nuclei in their trophic plasmodium phase; the small, non-veined proto-plasmodia have between 8–100 nuclei, while large, veined meshworks have between 100 and 10 million nuclei. All of these remain part of a single cell, which has a viscous, slimy consistency, and may be transparent, white, or brightly coloured in orange, yellow, or pink.

The cell has chemotactic and negative phototactic capabilities in this phase, meaning that it is able to move towards nutrients and away from dangerous substances and light. The movements originate in the grainy cytoplasm, which streams by pulsation in one direction within the cell. In this way the cell reaches a speed of up to 1000 μm per second – the speed in plant cells is 2–78 μm per second. A resting state, the so-called sclerotium, may occur in this phase. The sclerotium is a hardened, resistant form composed of numerous "macrocysts", which enable the myxogastria to survive in adverse conditions, for example during winter or dry periods, in this phase.

Fruit bodies of the myxogastria

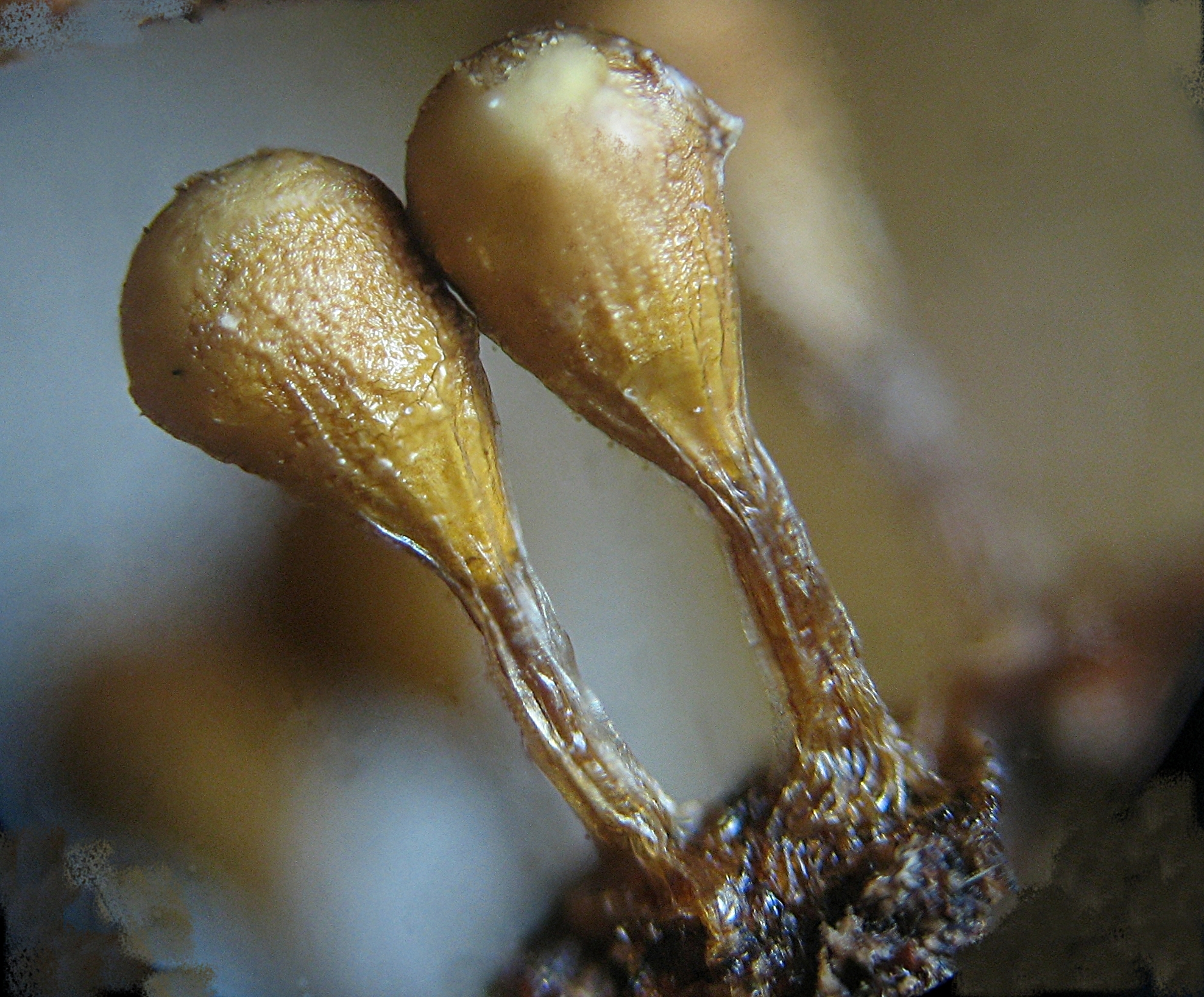
Sporangia (pediculated) of Trichia decipiens (Trichiales)

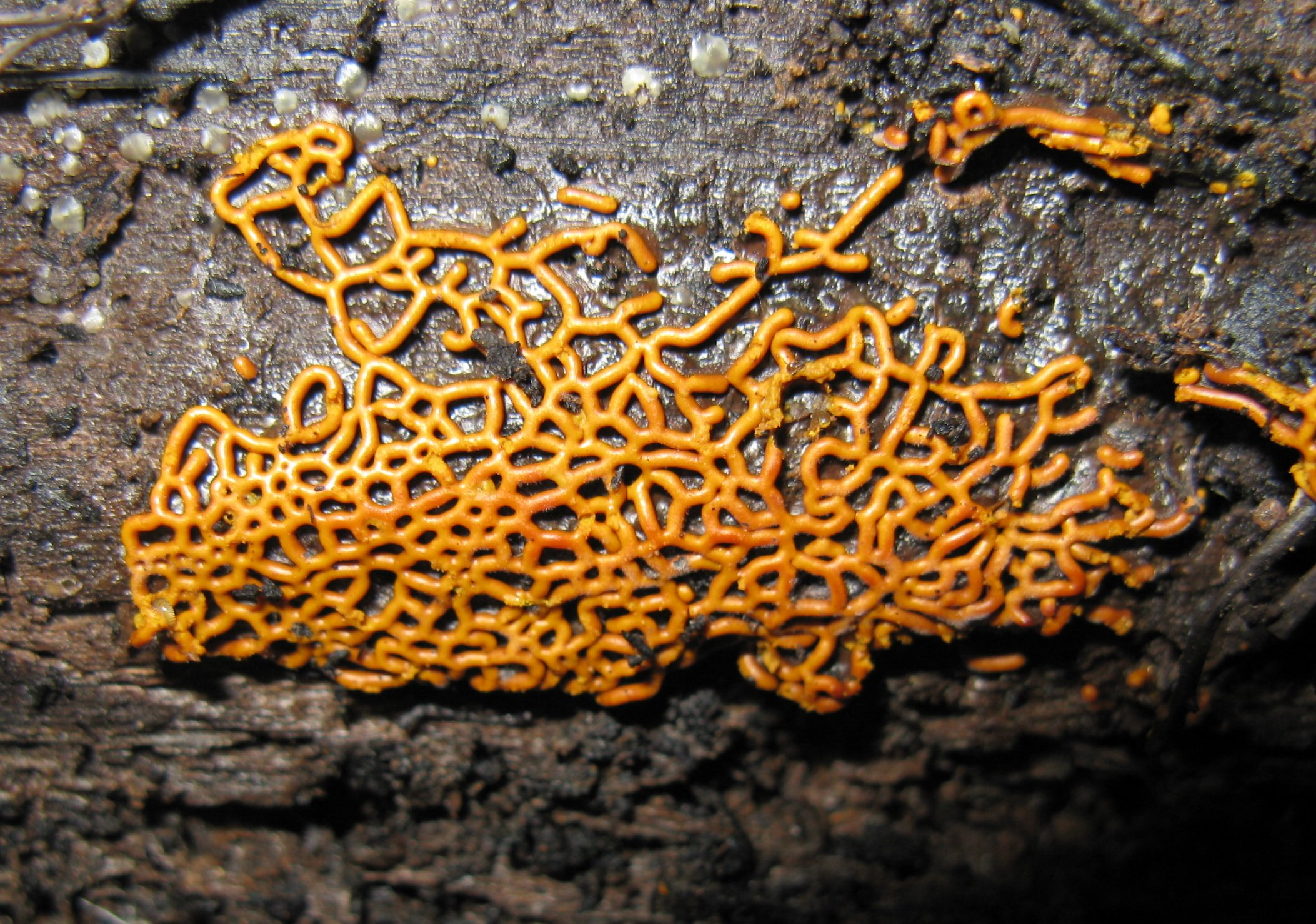
Plasmodiocarp of Hemitrichia serpula (Trichiales)

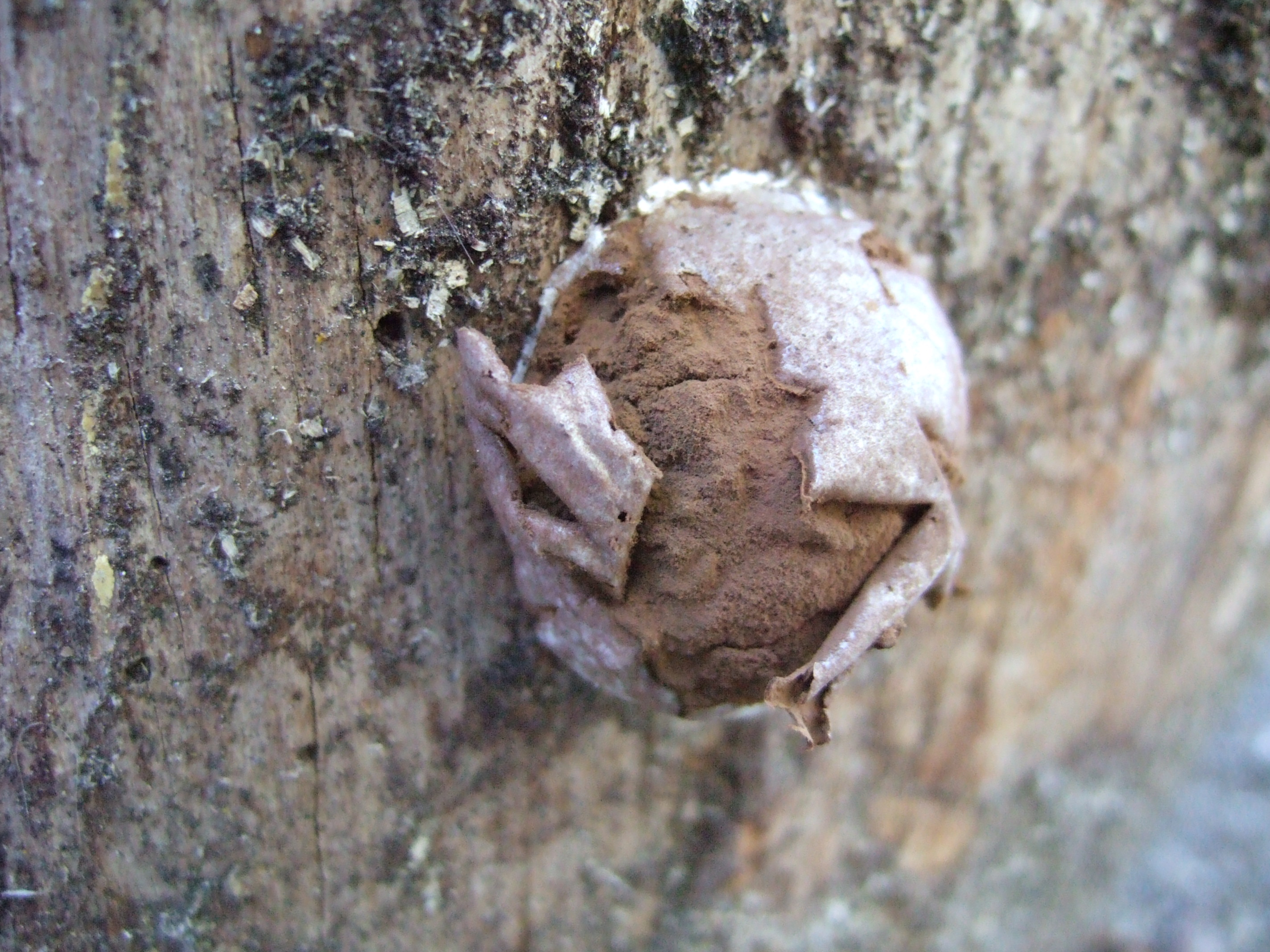
Aethalium of Enteridium lycoperdon (Liceales)

=== Fructification ===
Mature plasmodia can produce fruit bodies under appropriate circumstances. The exact triggers for this process are unknown. According to laboratory researchers, changes in humidity, temperature or pH value as well as starvation periods were thought to be the triggers in some species. The plasmodia abandon their nutrient intake and crawl, attracted by light – a positive phototaxis – towards a dry, light area, to get an optimal spread of the spores. Once the fructification begins, it cannot be stopped. If disturbances occur, malformed spore-bearing fruit bodies are often produced.

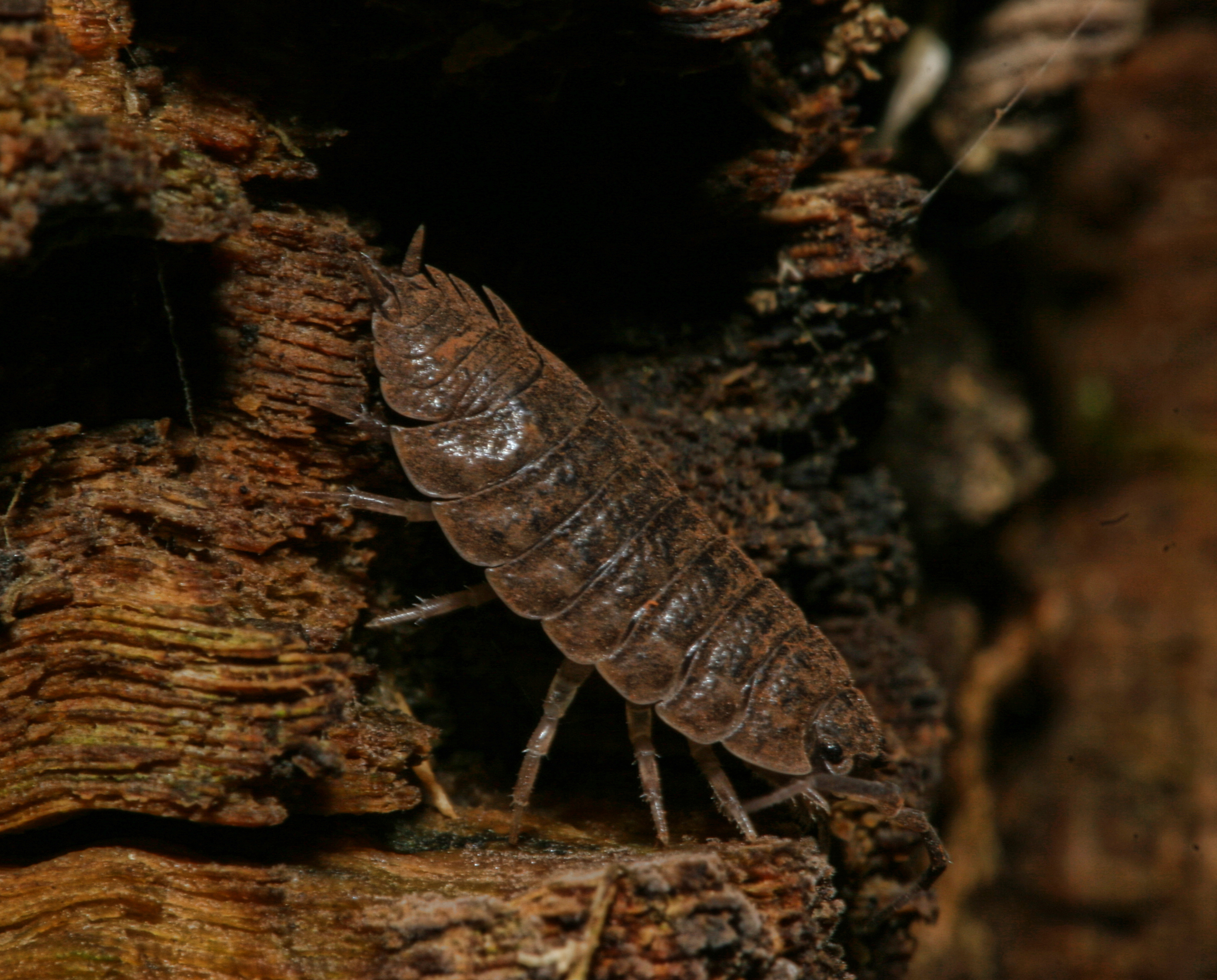
Woodlouse with myxogastria spores

The plasmodium or parts of the fruit bodies can be smaller than one millimetre, in extreme cases they are up to a square metre and weigh up to 20 kilograms (44 lb) (Brefeldia maxima). Their shape is often pediculated or unstiped sporangia with non-cellular stems, but can also appear as veined or netted plasmodiocarps, pincushion-shaped aethaliae or seemingly pincushion-shaped pseudo-aethaliae. The fruit bodies almost always have a hypothallus on the edge. The abundantly produced spores are stored in a reticular or filamentous structure – the so-called capillitium – and are found on nearly all species except Liceida and other species from the genus Echinostelium. When the open fruit bodies have dried, the spores are dispersed by wind or by small animals such as woodlice, mites or beetles, which either pick up the spores through contact with the fruit bodies or ingest and then excrete them. Dispersal by running water is also possible, but it plays a minor role.

=== Asexual forms ===
Some Myxogastria species may produce asexually. These are continuously diploid. There is no meiosis before the germination of the spores and the production of the plasmodium proceeds without germination of two cells.

== Distribution and ecology ==
=== Distribution ===
Myxogastria are distributed worldwide; species were found by early researchers on all continents. However, as many parts of the world were yet not discovered or explored, the exact distribution is not fully known. Europe and North America are often considered the basic habitat of the Myxogastria species. According to recent research, the majority of species are not widely distributed. The Myxogastria are most commonly found in temperate latitudes, and rarely in the polar regions, the subtropics or tropics. The physical features of the substrate and climatic conditions are the major aspects of the species' presence. Endemism is rare.

In the northern areas, the species can be found in Alaska, Iceland, northern Scandinavia, Greenland and Russia. These are not only particular, specialised species; according to an overview study, more than 150 species were found in the arctic and subarctic regions of Iceland, Greenland, northern Russia and Alaska. These distinctly exceed the tree line. In Greenland, the habitat may reach the 77th latitude line. The Myxogastria species reach their largest biodiversity and highest frequency in forests of temperate regions, which are ideal habitats because of the amount of rich organic material, suitable humidity (not too high) and long-lasting snow cover for snow-inhabiting species.

Few Myxogastria species are found in the tropics and subtropics, mainly because of the high humidity which prevents the necessary dehydration of the fruit bodies to permit spore dispersal and promotes infestation by moulds. Other factors are low light levels under the forest canopy which reduces phototaxis, light winds, poor soils, natural enemies and heavy rainfall which can wash away or destroy cells. Species living in soil or deadwood decrease as humidity increases. In a study from Costa Rica, 73% of the total findings were in the relatively dry Tropical Moist Forest, while 18% were in the very moist Tropical Premontane Wet Forests and only 9% in Lower Premontane Rain Forest.

In the Antarctic, species were found in the South Shetland Islands, South Orkney Islands, South Georgia and the Antarctic Peninsula. Species from the Antarctic or subantarctic regions are rarer than specimens in the Arctic regions, although lack of access may be a factor. Until 1983, only 5 records were made, with only individual finds since then. According to two studies of the myxomycete flora of these regions, more species were discovered in the subantarctic forests, for example 67 species in Argentinian Patagonia and Tierra del Fuego, and 22 on high ground on Macquarie Island.

=== Habitats ===
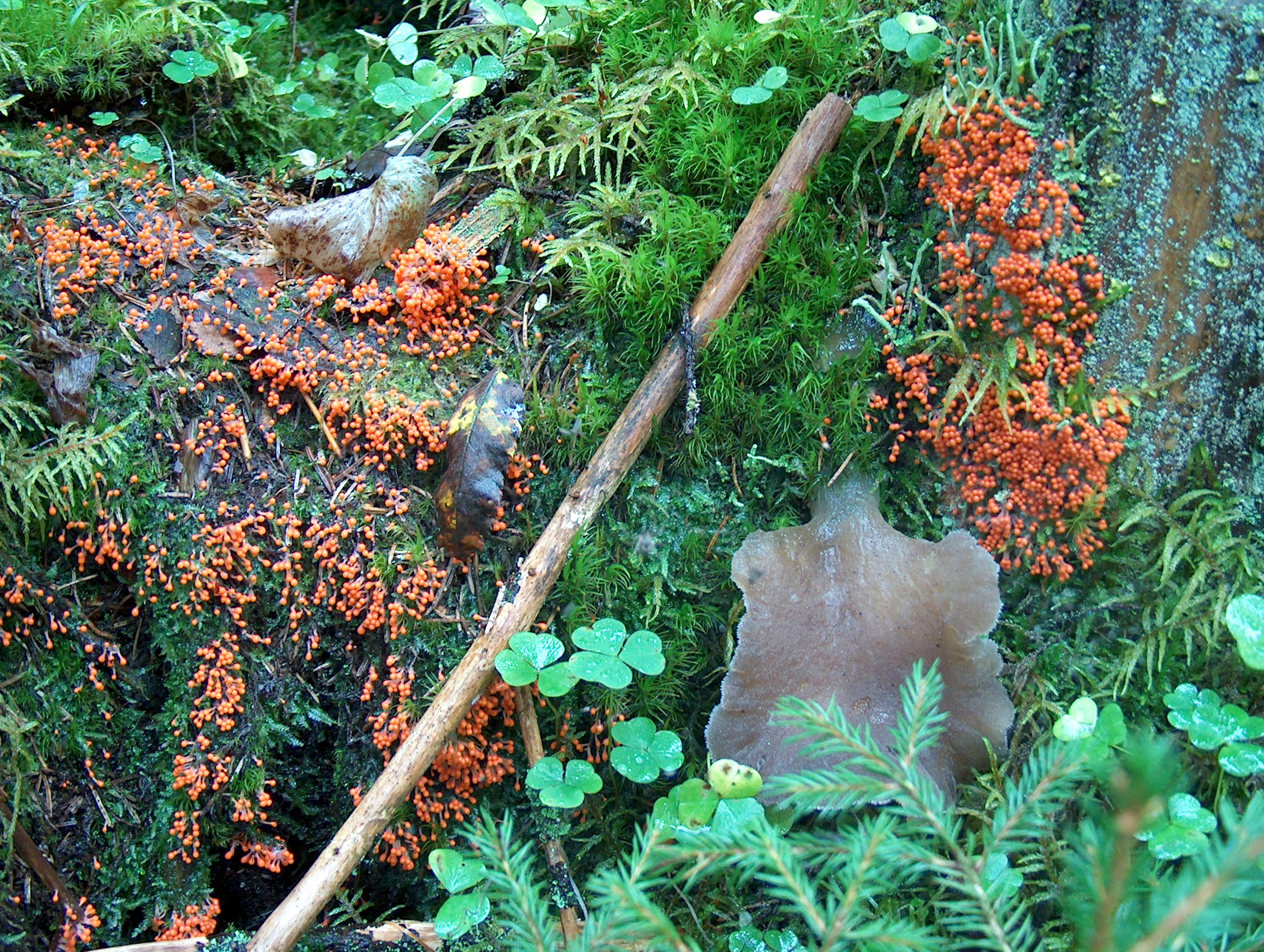
Trichia decipiens (Trichiales, orange sporangia), with mosses, fungi and plants on deadwood

The majority of Myxogastria species live terrestrially in open forests. The most important microhabitat is deadwood, but also the bark of living trees (corticolous myxomycetes), rotting plant material, soil, and animal excrements. Slime moulds may be found in numerous unusual locations. The comprehensive group of the nivicol Myxogastria populate closed snow blankets, to quickly fructificate at exposure – for example during thaws – and release their spores. Other habitats are deserts – 33 species were found in the Sonora desert, for example – or living on leaves from plants in the tropics. Some species live in aquatic environments, such as those of the genera Didymium, Physarum, Perichaena, Fuligo, Comatricha and Licea, which were found living underwater as myxoflagellates and plasmodia. All but one species, Didymium difforme, fructificated only when the water ebbed or when they left it.

=== Relationship to other creatures ===
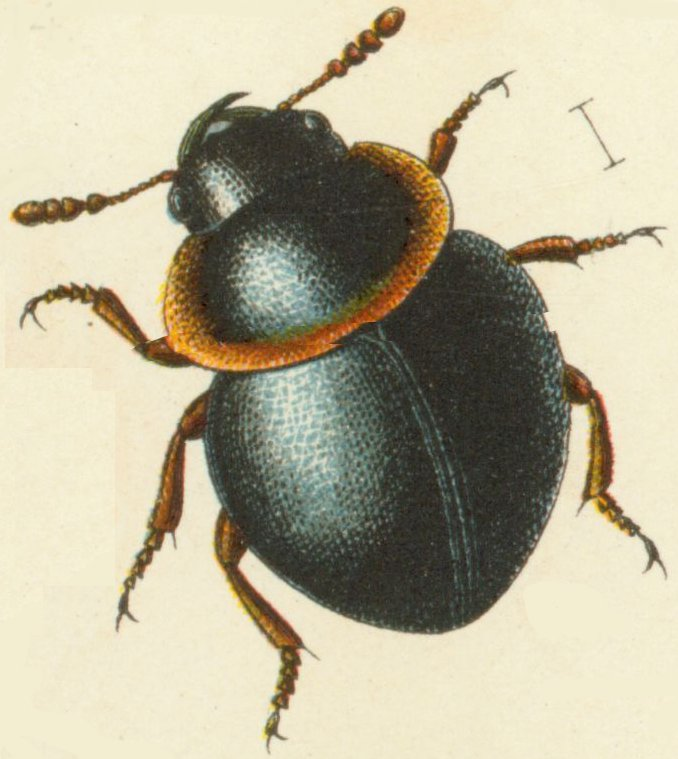
Agathidium mandibulare, a natural enemy of Myxogastria

The relationships of the Myxogastria to other creatures have not been thoroughly researched as of 2012. Their natural predators include many arthropods, including mites and springtails, and especially beetles such as the rove beetles, round fungus beetles, wrinkled bark beetles, Eucinetidae, Clambidae, Eucnemidae (false click beetles), Sphindidae, Cerylonidae, and minute brown scavenger beetles. Various Nematodes have also been observed to be their predators; they attach their posterior portion on the cytosol of the plasmodia or even live within the strands. Certain Diptera species have evolved to specialise in this way: these are mostly representatives of the Mycetophilidae, Sciaridae and Drosophilidae. The species Epicypta testata was especially frequently found, especially on Enteridium lycoperdon, Enteridium splendens, Lycogala epidendrum, and Tubifera ferruginosa.

Some true fungi specialise in the colonisation of the Myxogastriae: almost all of these are species of sac fungi. The most common such fungus is Verticillium rexianum – mainly species from Comatricha or Stemonitis. Gliocladium album and Sesquicillium microsporum are often found on Physaridae, while Polycephalomyces tomentosus is often found on certain species of Trichiidae. Nectriopsis violacea specialises on Fuligo septica. Bacterial associates, mainly from the family Enterobacteriaceae, were discovered on plasmodia. The combination of plasmodia and bacteria can bind atmospheric nitrogen or produce enzymes which make possible the decomposition of e.g. lignin, carboxymethylcellulose, or xylan. In a few cases, the plasmodia acquired salt tolerance or tolerance of heavy metals through this association.

Some myxomycetes (Physarum) cause disease in plants such as turfgrasses, but no control is usually necessary against them.

== Fossil records ==
Fossil records of Myxogastria are extremely rare. Due to their short lifespan and the fragile structures of the plasmodia and the fruit body, fossilisation and similar processes are not possible. Only their spores can be mineralised. The few known examples of fossilised living states are preserved in amber.

As of 2010 three fruit bodies, two spores and one plasmodium have been described. Two older taxa – Charles Eugène Bertrand's Myxomycetes mangini and Bretonia hardingheni from 1892 – are now considered dubious and are today often disregarded. Friedrich Walter Domke described in 1952 a 35 to 40 million year old find in Baltic amber of Stemonitis splendens, an extant species. The state and completeness of the fruit bodies are remarkable, enabling accurate determination. From the same period, location and material is an Arcyria sulcata, first described in 2003 by Heinrich Dörfelt and Alexander Schmidt, a species very similar to today's Arcyria denudata. Both discoveries imply that the fruit bodies of the Myxogastria have changed only slightly in the last 35–40 million years.

However, the Protophysarum balticum from Baltic amber, first described by Dörfelt and Schmidt in 2006, is considered questionable. The fossil was inconsistent with the typical characteristics of the genus and it was not a valid publication because no Latin name was identified with it. Also, important details of its fruit bodies were not visible or contradicted the identification. Today it is assumed that the fossil belongs to a lichen similar to the genus Chaenotheca.

The only known discovery of a preserved plasmodium was found in Dominican amber, and was then grouped into the Physarida. However, this claim is also considered doubtful as the publication was later classified as insufficient due to lack of evidence.

In 2019 sporocarps belonging to Stemonitis was described from Burmese amber, considered to be of a mid-Cretaceous age around 99 million years old. The sporocarps are indistinguishable from extant taxa, suggesting a long morphological stasis.

The only known mineralised fossils are the two spore findings from 1971, one of which, Trichia favoginea, is assumed to be from the postglacial period. In palynologian researches, by absorbing Myxogastria spores, the fossil was not recognised.

== History of research ==
Because of their unprepossessing nature, the Myxogastriae were for a long time not well researched. Thomas Panckow first named the mould Lycogala epidendrum as "Fungus cito crescentes" (fast-growing fungus) in his 1654 book Herbarium Portatile, oder behendes Kräuter- und Gewächsbuch. In 1729, Pier Antonio Micheli thought that fungi are different from moulds, and Heinrich Friedrich Link agreed with this hypothesis in 1833. Elias Magnus Fries documented the plasmodial stage in 1829, and 35 years later Anton de Bary observed the germination of the spores. De Bary also discovered the cyclosis in the cell for the movement, he saw them as animal-like creatures and reclassified them as Mycetozoa, which literally translates "Fungus animals". This interpretation prevailed until the second half of the 20th century.

From 1874 to 1876, Józef Tomasz Rostafiński, a student of Anton de Bary, published the first extensive monograph on the group. Three monographs by Arthur Lister and Gulielma Lister were published in 1894, 1911, and 1925. These were groundbreaking works about the Myxogastria, as was the 1934 book The Myxomycetes by Thomas H. Macbride and George Willard Martin. Important works in the late 20th century were the 1969 monographs by George Willard Martin and Constantine John Alexopoulos, and the 1975 monograph by Lindsay Shepherd Olive. The first is perhaps the most notable, as with it "the modern era of the taxonomy of the Myxogastria began". Other notable researchers were Persoon, Rostafinski, Lister, Macbridge, and Martin and Alexopoulos, who discovered and classified many species. (Note: In addition to the monographs dealing with the group worldwide, some local populations are also important, especially since the group has significantly less regional variation, due to its erratic method of wide dispersion. For example, R. Hagelstein (1944) The Mycetozoa of North America, and M. Farr's volume (1973) for the Flora Neotropica series are important regional descriptions. Other, more recent regional publications are Bruce Ing's The Myxomycetes of Britain and Ireland, L. Band & P. Band (1997) Flora Mycologica Iberica, and Yamamoto (1998) The Myxomycete Biota of Japan. The three-volume work Die Myxomyceten Deutschlands und des angrenzenden Alpenraumes unter besonderer Berücksichtigung Österreichs (The Myxomyceta of Germany and bordering Alpine regions, with special consideration of Austria) was written from 1993 to 2000 by H. Neubert, W. Nowotny, and K. Baumann, which [Baumann] self-published. Although academically they were amateurs, their work was well received by scholars, and has become a frequently-cited standard work.)
