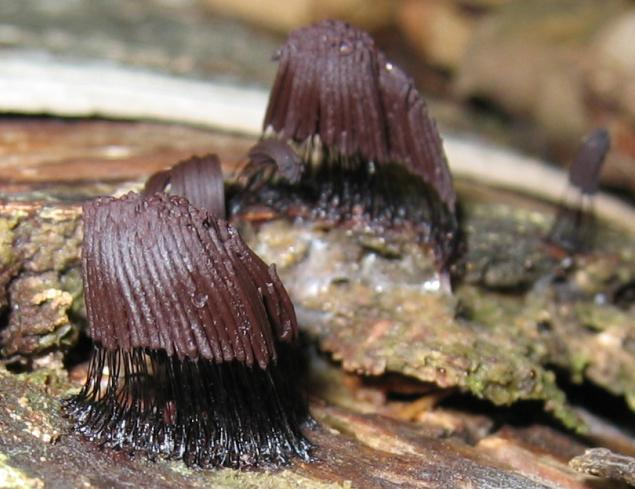
- Stemonitis fusca

Scientific classification
- Domain: Eukaryota
- Clade: Amorphea
- Phylum: Amoebozoa
- Class: Myxogastria
- Order: Stemonitidales; T. Macbr.

Families
- Amaurochaetaceae; Stemonitidaceae

Synonyms
- Stemonitida

= Stemonitidales =

Order of slime moulds

Stemonitidales, also known as Stemonitida (ICZN) or Stemonitales is an order of amoebozoan slime molds in the class Myxogastria.
