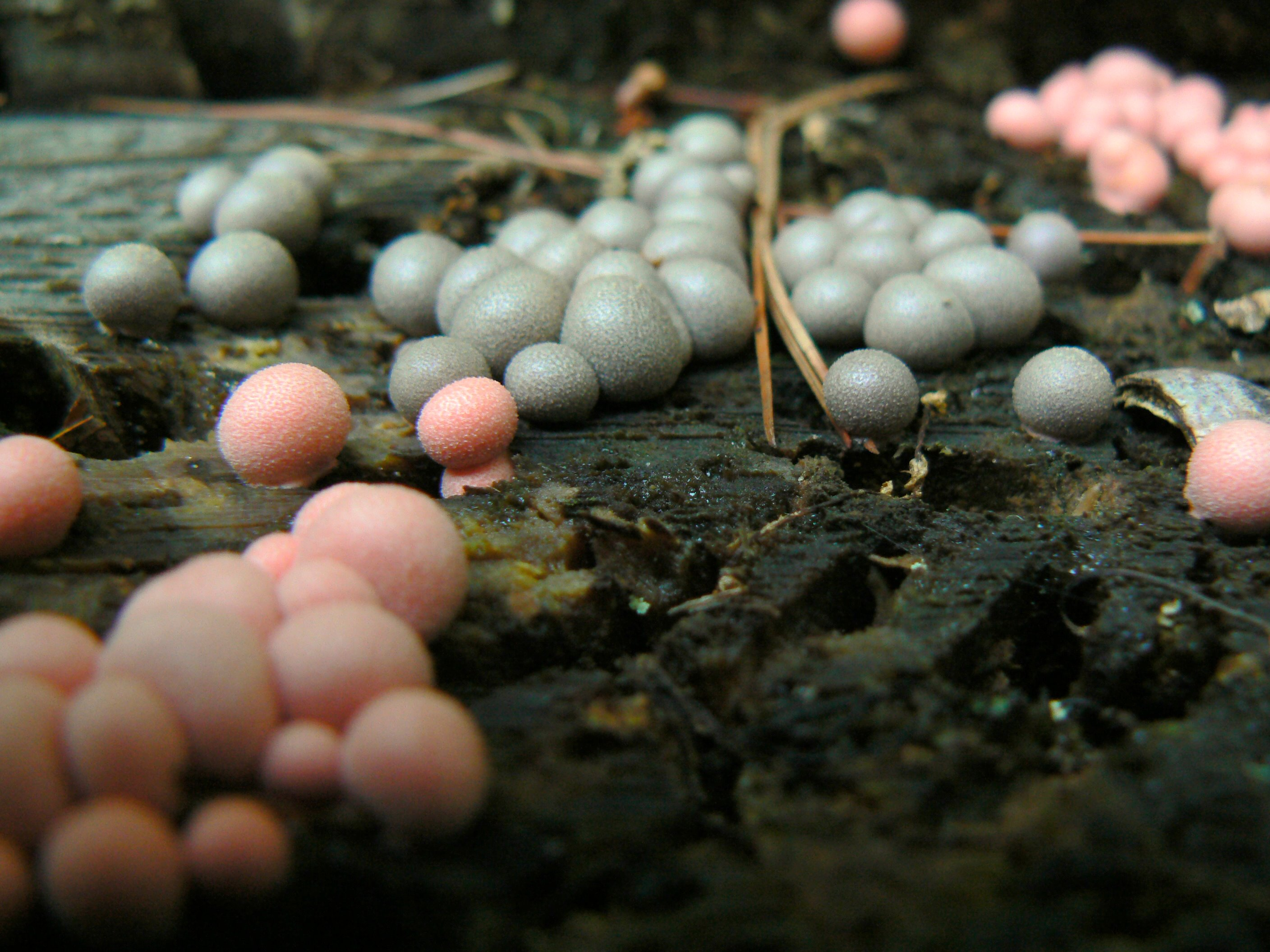
- Lycogala epidendrum

Scientific classification
- Domain: Eukaryota
- Phylum: Amoebozoa
- Class: Myxogastria
- Order: Liceales
- Family: Reticulariaceae

= Reticulariaceae =

Family of slime moulds

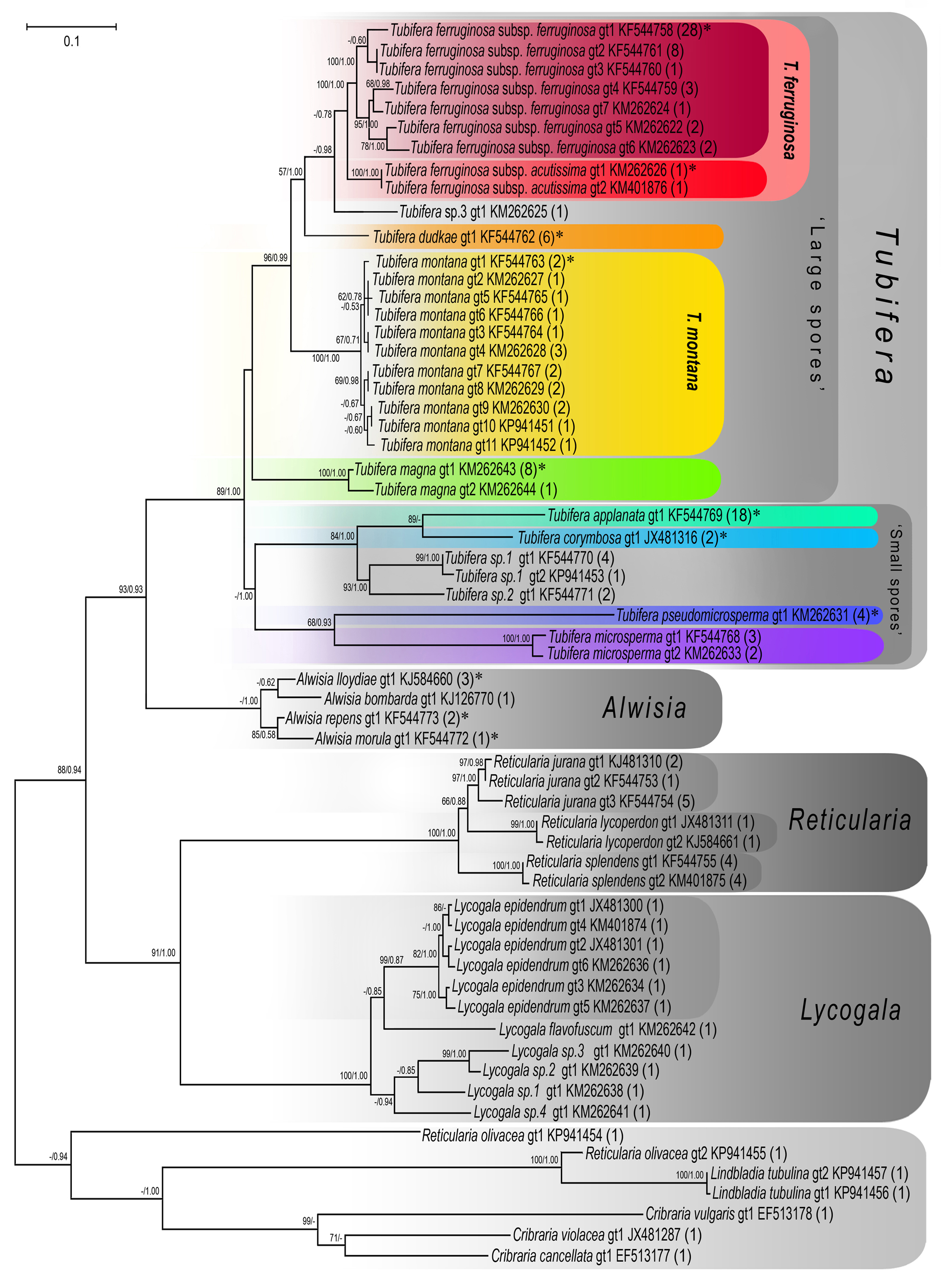
Evolutionary tree of the family Reticulariaceae

Reticulariaceae is a family of slime molds recognized by the Integrated Taxonomic Information System and is composed of the genera Dictydiaethalium, Enteridium, Lycogala, Reticularia, and Tubifera.

However, other classifications place Dictydiaethalium in the family Dictydiaethaliaceae and the other genera above in the family Tubiferaceae.
