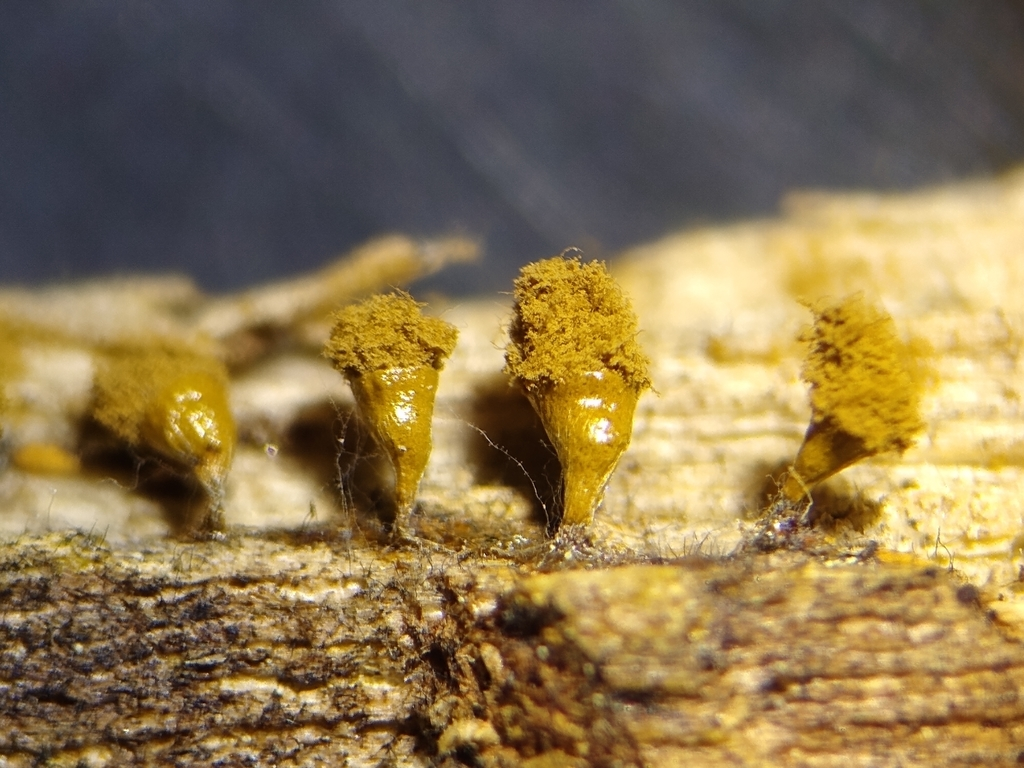
- Trichia crateriformis on rotting wood with a dehisced peridium revealing capillitium threads

Scientific classification
- Domain: Eukaryota
- Phylum: Amoebozoa
- Class: Myxogastria
- Order: Trichiales
- Family: Trichiaceae
- Genus: Trichia
- Species: T. crateriformis

Binomial name
- Trichia crateriformis (G.W. Martin), 1963

= Trichia crateriformis =

Species of slime mould

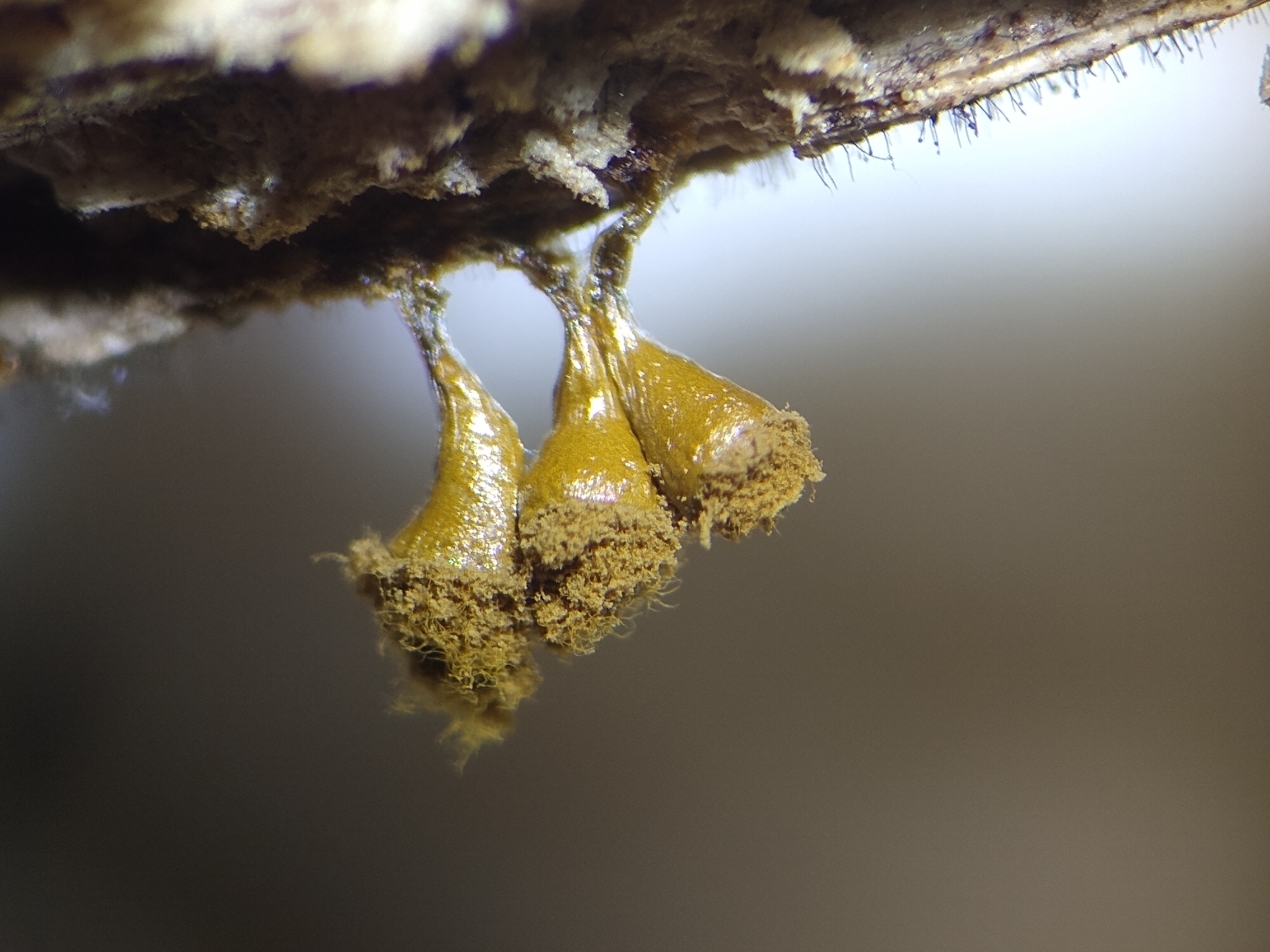
Trichia crateriformis, fruiting

Trichia crateriformis is a slime mold species in the order Trichiida found in temperate areas throughout the world.

== Taxonomy ==
Trichia crateriformis was first described by G.W. Martin in 1962 as Trichia craterioides after viewing a sample collected on dead wood from Riccarton Bush, South Island, New Zealand in June 1957. Upon learning that this was a homonym for an earlier described species from 1838, G.W. Martin renamed the species to T. crateriformis in 1963. The species has also been described as T. fallax var. olivacea Meyl., 1908, T. decipiens var. olivacea (Meyl.) Meyl., 1924, and T. decipiens f. olivacea (Meyl.) Y. Yamam, 1998. A 2013 study found slight differences in how the peridium dehisces to release spores between each of these synonyms, but still concluded the synonyms constitute a single species. The species does not have any common names.

The closest relatives of the species are T. fallax, T. botrytis, and T. decipiens, which T. crateriformis is often confused with. Of these species, T. crateriformis is the only one with evenly distributed star-like spore ornamentation; the others have either irregular warts or long ridges. Further, among these species, the peridium of T. crateriformis is the only one to break along a clearly defined margin. Within the genus Trichia, T. crateriformis is the only described species with an operculate sporangium.

== Morphology ==
The plasmodium, the diploid stage of the slime mold created when haploid spores undergo syngamy, has not yet been described. The hypothallus, where the fruiting body attaches to the substrate, is inconspicuous. The sporocarps of the species are usually 1 to 1.5 mm in height. The sporocarps are stipitate with a dark, cylindrical stipe between .2 and .75 mm long that is filled with cell-like bodies. The stipe has a diameter between 13 and 20 μm. On top of the stipe, there is an olive green to olive brown non-cellular peridium ranging from .75 to 1 mm in diameter. The peridium completely surrounds the sporangia. The shape of the peridium is ovate to obeoniacaeous, though the peridium degrades as it ages to leave a calyculus where the stipe meets the peridium. This calyculus is iridescent and hollow with parallel ridges running upwards from the stipe. As immature fruiting bodies are dried, a circular indentation appears in almost all of their peridia.

The capillitium (the sterile fibers within the peridium) of the mass are pale yellow to ochreous-brown and are composed of yellow to brown elaters 5-8 μm thick and over 250 μm long. Each capillitium has 7 to 8 broad, smooth elaters that have been tightly-packed into 4 to 5 prominent spirals. These capillitia have a uniform diameter except for occasional spines and attenuating tips roughly 25 μm long.

The spores of the species are formed within the peridium among the capillitia. They are yellow, hyaline, and globose with evenly-distributed and well-marked crest-like ornamentation. These crests are created by the convergence of multiple bacula, small rod-like structures, less than .5 μm long, and they look curvy or irregular, often giving a star-like appearance. The spores are between 11 and 12.5 μm long.

The species is notable for its dull olive-brown cellular operculum. This operculum is wider than the slime mold's spores at approximately 12 to 14 μm across, and has a granular texture unlike the smooth peridium. The operculum is one-cell thick, and mycologists G. Moreno and A. Castillo suggest that the operculum is formed by tightly collapsed spores. As a result, the operculum's surface is similar to a spore's, though wrinkles are more common on the operculum and warts are more common on the spores. Most slime molds’ operculum and peridium have similar texture and color, so the stark differences between the two in T. crateriformis is noteworthy. A 1986 SEM study hypothesized that this difference was attributable to a closer relationship between spore cleavage and operculum formation in the species.

The varieties attributed to T. crateriformis can be distinguished from T. crateriformis by the dehiscence, or splitting, of the peridium. In T. crateriformis, a circular area dehisces; in T. fallax var. olivacea, the peridium completely dehisces at the sporocarp's apex; and in T. decipiens var. olivacea, the peridium dehisces at the apex, but remains attached. For all of these varieties, the area of the peridium that dehisces is thinner than the rest of the peridium.

== Habitat and ecology ==
The ecology and distribution of T. crateriformis have not been intensively studied, though the species has been reported throughout the world. The type specimen originated from the coast of New Zealand's South Island and was found on dead wood. The species was thought to be rare until a 2013 study examined the morphological differences between Trichia species and reclassified multiple species varieties into T. crateriformis, resulting in more T. crateriformis sightings. It has since been reported on decaying gymnosperm wood in the western Himalayas, decaying Nothofagus pumilio trees in Argentina amid receding snow, Euphorbia ground litter in Madagascar and rotting deciduous wood in Russia's Novgorod Oblast. Beyond scholarly research, people have reported T. crateriformis across temperate regions in North America, South America, Europe, Madagascar, and Oceania.

From this information, it seems T. crateriformis is distributed across temperate forests and is most often found on decaying wood towards the end of winter. The species is often associated with other slime molds, including species of the genera Trichia, Arcyria, and Hemitrichia, as well as the species Lycogala epidendrum. No studies on the ecological role of T. crateriformis have been conducted. If T. crateriformis is like other members of the class Myxogastria, the species does not consume the wood it sits on, but rather consumes the bacteria feeding on the decaying wood. As a result, members of Myxogastria often serve as important decomposers and food sources for higher trophic levels.

== Relevance ==
Few studies have investigated T. crateriformis importance for humans, though a 1989 paper illustrated that members of the genus Trichia produce naphthoquinone derivatives like trichione and homotrichone for sporocarp pigmentation. Naphthoquinone derivatives have been shown to be cytotoxic, providing them "significant antibacterial, antifungal, antiviral, insecticidal, anti-inflammatory, and antipyretic properties." Some also disturb the cardiovascular system of humans. These derivatives therefore serve an important pharmacological and antimicrobial role, such as the wound-healing shikonin, the herbicide Juglone, and the genotoxic plumbagin. As such, the naphthoquinone derivatives of T. crateriformis could be used as a reagent for the partial synthesis of medicines or pesticides or as a potential medicine/pesticide itself.

The species is also notable for its relatively unique cellular operculum made of compacted spores. Understanding the development of this operculum could be helpful for understanding spore, operculum, and peridium development in other members of Myxogastria.
