= Star jelly =

Gelatinous substance sometimes found on the ground

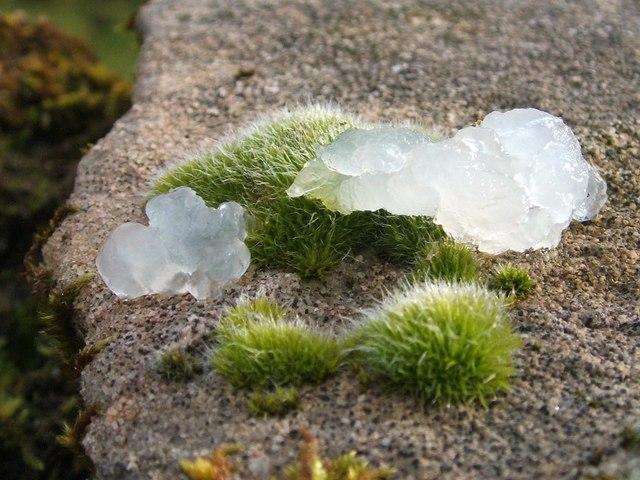
An instance of unidentified star jelly on Grimmia pulvinata, a species of moss.

Star jelly (also called astromyxin, astral jelly) is a gelatinous substance sometimes found on grass and less commonly on the branches of trees. According to folklore, it is deposited on the Earth during meteor showers. It is described as a translucent or grayish-white gelatin that tends to evaporate shortly after having "fallen".

Explanations have ranged from it being the remains of frogs, toads, or worms, to colonies of cyanobacteria, to being the fruiting bodies of jelly fungi or masses of amoeba called slime molds. Nonbiological origins proposed for instances of star jelly have included byproducts from industrial production or waste management. Reports of the substance date back to the 14th century and have continued to the present.

== History ==
There have been reports of 'star-jelly' for centuries. John of Gaddesden (1280–1361) mentions stella terrae (Latin for 'star of the earth' or 'earth-star') in his medical writings, describing it as "a certain mucilaginous substance lying upon the earth" and suggesting that it might be used to treat abscesses. A fourteenth-century Latin medical glossary has an entry for uligo, described as "a certain fatty substance emitted from the earth, that is commonly called 'a star which has fallen'". Similarly, an English-Latin dictionary from around 1440 has an entry for sterre slyme with the Latin equivalent given as assub (a rendering of Arabic ash-shuhub, also used in medieval Latin as a term for a "falling" or "shooting" star). In Welsh it has been referred to as pwdre ser meaning "rot from the stars".

In 1910, T. M. Hughes ruminated in Nature as to why poets and ancient writers associated meteors with star jelly, and observed that the jelly seemed to "grow out from among the roots of grass".

The Oxford English Dictionary lists a large number of other names for the substance, with references dating back to the circa-1440 English-Latin dictionary entry mentioned above: star-fallen, star-falling, star-jelly, star-shot, star-slime, star-slough, star-slubber, star-spurt, and star-slutch.

The slime mold Enteridium lycoperdon is called caca de luna ("moon's feces") by the locals in the state of Veracruz in Mexico.

== Scientific analysis and theories ==
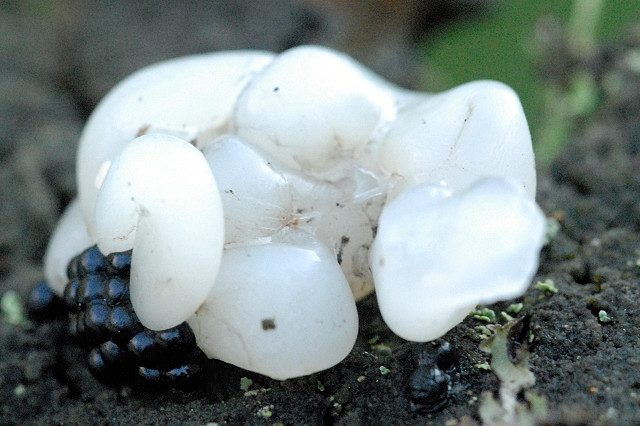
Oviducts of amphibians regurgitated by predators. (The black object in lower left corner is a cluster of eggs.)

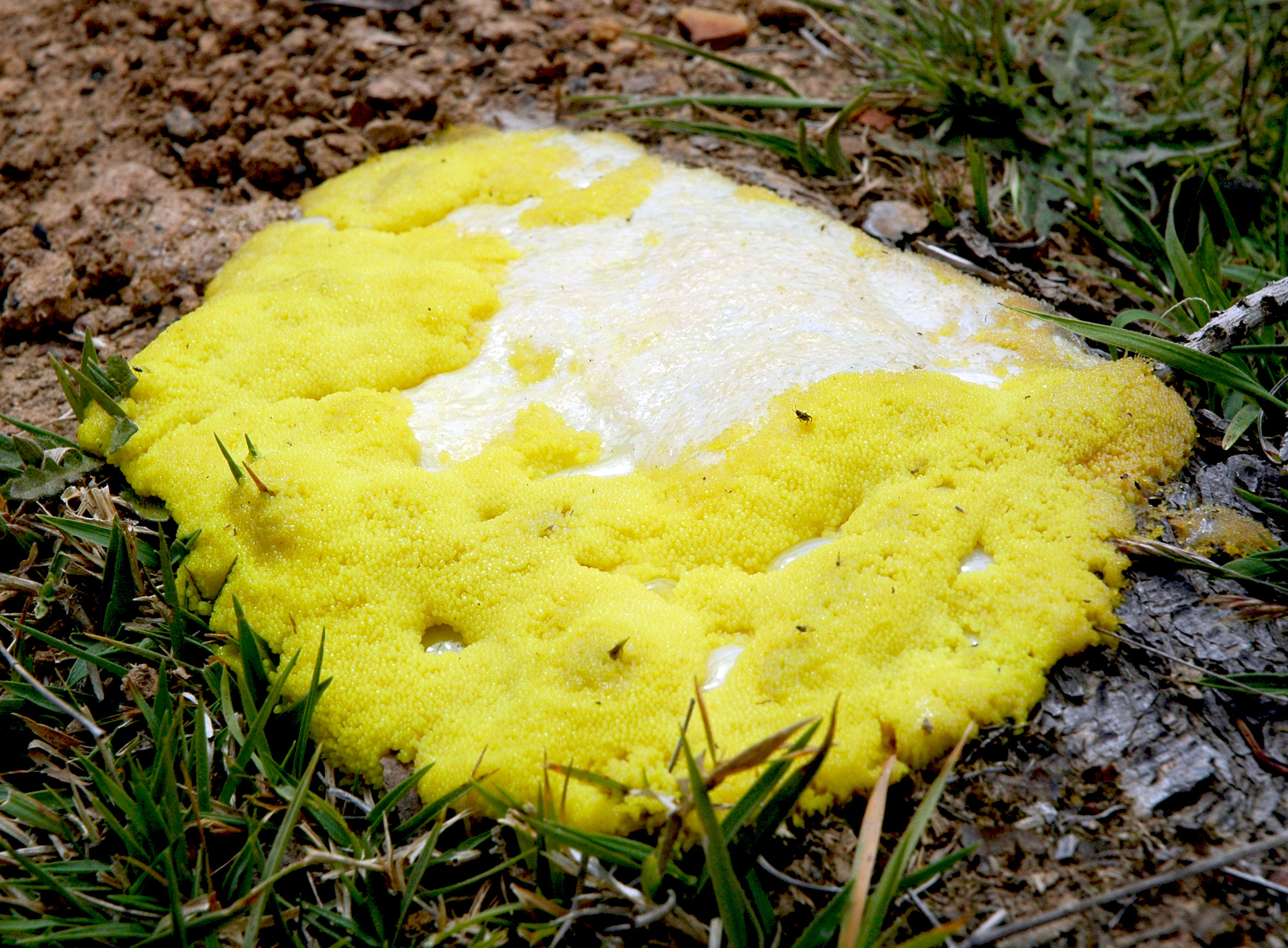
Fructification of a slime mold

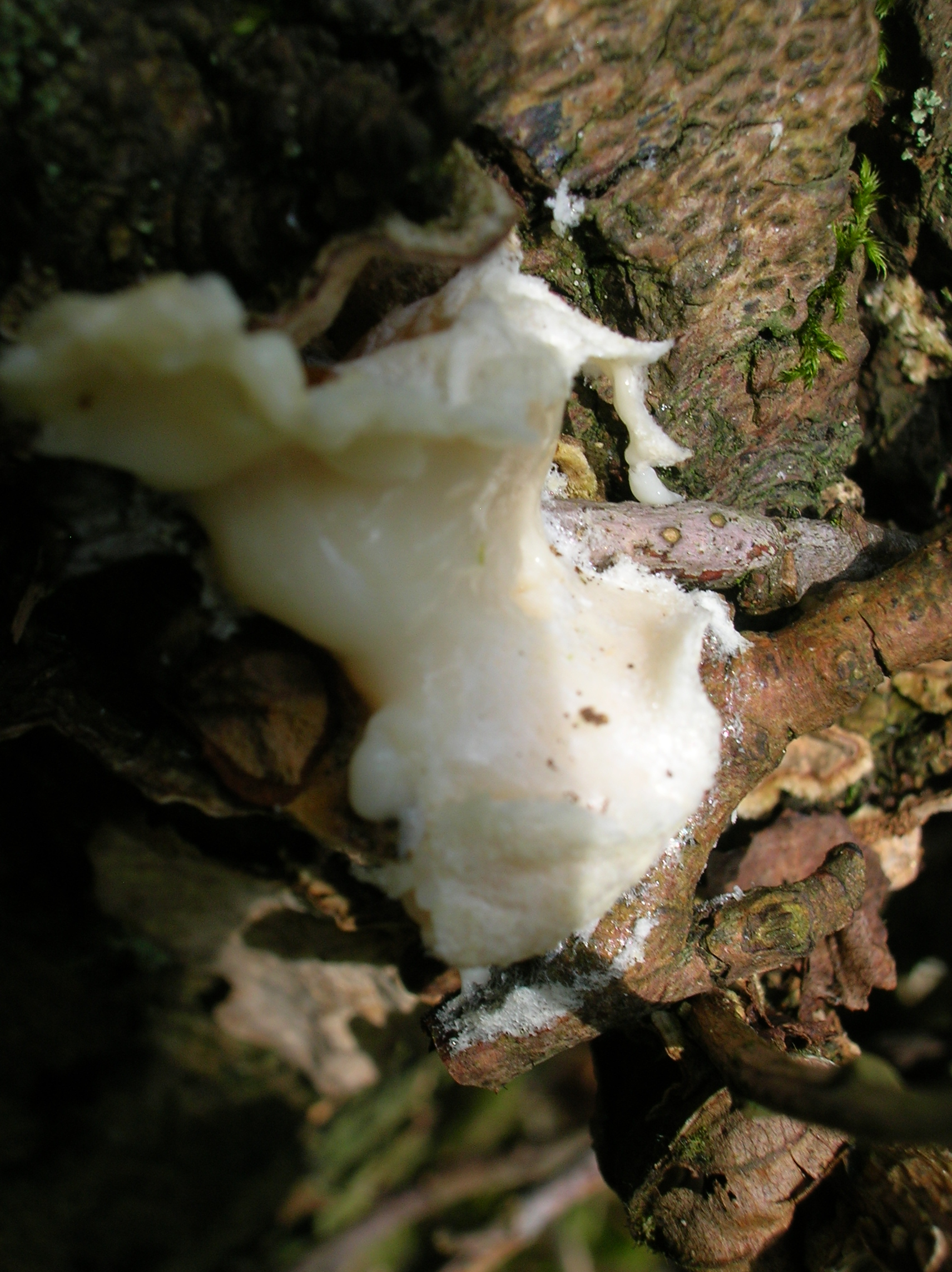
The false puffball slime mold in its aethalioid jelly phase

- Myxarium nucleatum, a clear, gelatinous fungus that grows on decaying wood.
- Observations made of star jelly in Scotland support the theory that one origin of star jelly is spawn jelly from frogs or toads, which has been vomited up by amphibian-eating creatures. The German terms Sternenrotz (star snot) and Meteorgallerte (meteorite jelly) are known to refer to more or less digested frog spawn vomited by predators (Schlüpmann 2007).
- A related theory is that it derives from the glands in the oviducts of frogs and toads. Birds and mammals eat the animals but not the oviducts which, when they come into contact with moisture, swell and distort, leaving a vast pile of jellylike substance sometimes also referred to as otter jelly.
- Scientists commissioned by the National Geographic Society have carried out tests on samples found in the United States, but have failed to find any DNA in the material.
- Thomas Pennant in the 18th century believed the material to be "something vomited up by birds or animals".
- Nostoc, a type of fresh water blue-green algae (cyanobacteria) forms spherical colonies made of filaments of cells in a gelatinous sheath. When on the ground, it is ordinarily not seen; but after rainfall, it swells up into a conspicuous jellylike mass which is sometimes called star-jelly.
- Slime molds are possible causes, appearing suddenly, exhibiting a very gelatinous appearance at first and later changing to a dust-like form which is dispersed by rain and wind. The colours range from a striking pure white as in Enteridium lycoperdon, to pink as in Lycogala epidendrum, to purple, bright yellow, orange, and brown.

== Examples ==
- A jelly-like substance was seen "after a luminous meteor" somewhere between Siena and Rome in 1652.
- A jelly-like substance was found where a meteor had fallen to Earth in 1718 in Leti (island).
- According to a Philadelphia Inquirer story, police officers in South Philadelphia, Pennsylvania saw what appeared to be a parachute drift through the air and land in an open field about 10 PM on September 26, 1950. According to various accounts, the officers said the object glowed purple when they shined flashlights on it, felt sticky when they touched it, and shortly dissolved leaving no residue. The story was "picked up in the national press as a sort of joke", and has been credited with being the inspiration for the 1958 film The Blob.
- On 11 August 1979, Sybil Christian of Frisco, Texas reported the discovery of several purple blobs of goo on her front yard following a Perseid meteor shower. A follow-up investigation by reporters and an assistant director of the Fort Worth Museum of Science and History discovered a battery reprocessing plant outside of town where caustic soda was used to clean impurities from the lead in the batteries, resulting in a purplish compound as a byproduct. The report was greeted with some skepticism, however, as the compounds at the reprocessing plant were solid, whereas the blobs on Christian's lawn were gelatinous. Others, however, have pointed out that Christian had tried to clear them off her lawn with a garden hose.
- In December 1983, grayish-white, oily gelatin fell on North Reading, Massachusetts. Thomas Grinley reported finding it on his lawn, on the streets and sidewalks, and dripping from gas station pumps.
- On several dates in 1994, "gelatinous rain" fell on Oakville, Washington.
- On the evening of 3 November 1996, a meteor was reported flashing across the sky of Kempton, Tasmania, just outside Hobart. The next morning, white translucent slime was reportedly discovered on the lawns and sidewalks of the town.
- In 1997, a similar substance fell in the Everett, Washington, area.
- Star jelly was found on various Scottish hills in the autumn of 2009.
- Blue balls of jelly rained down on a man's garden in Dorset in January 2012. Upon further analysis these proved to be sodium polyacrylate granules, a kind of superabsorbent polymer with a variety of common (including agricultural) uses. They were most likely already present on the ground in their dehydrated state, and had gone un-noticed until they soaked up water from the hail shower and consequently grew in size.
- Several deposits were discovered at the Ham Wall nature reserve in England in February 2013. It has been suggested that these are unfertilised frog spawn, regurgitated frog innards, or a form of cyanobacteria.
- In the BBC programme Nature's Weirdest Events, Series 4, episode 3, (14 January 2015) Chris Packham showed a specimen of "star jelly" and had it sent to the Natural History Museum, London, for a DNA analysis by David Bass who confirmed it was from a frog. He also found some traces of magpie DNA on the jelly which may point to the demise of the frog.
- In the Urbasa region of Navarra, Spain, specifically in the northeast of the Raso de Lezamen, star jelly has been observed repeatedly in November following substantial rainfall. It was found in wet grass, shallow ponds, and water-filled depressions. The substance was translucent, gelatinous, with no discernible odor or visible tissue, and disappeared within hours of observation.

== In fiction ==
Sir John Suckling, in 1641, wrote a poem which contained the following lines:

As he whose quicker eye doth trace
A false star shot to a mark'd place
Do's run apace,
And, thinking it to catch,
A jelly up do snatch

Henry More, in 1656 wrote:

That the Starres eat...that those falling Starres, as some call them, which are found on the earth in the form of a trembling gelly, are their excrement.

John Dryden, in 1679, wrote:

When I had taken up what I supposed a fallen star I found I had been cozened with a jelly.

William Somervile, in 1740, wrote in The Talisman:

Swift as the shooting star, that gilds the night
With rapid transient Blaze, she runs, she flies;
Sudden she stops nor longer can endure
The painful course, but drooping sinks away,
And like that falling Meteor, there she lyes
A jelly cold on earth.

Sir Walter Scott, in his novel The Talisman, wrote:

"Seek a fallen star," said the hermit, "and thou shalt only light on some foul jelly, which, in shooting through the horizon, has assumed for a moment an appearance of splendour."

An unidentifiable substance that falls to earth during a meteor-type event forms the background to "The Colour Out of Space", a 1927 short story by the American horror and science fiction author H. P. Lovecraft.

Some observers have made a connection between star jelly and the Paramount movie The Blob, in which a gelatinous monster slime falls from space. The Blob, which was released in 1958, was supposedly based on the Philadelphia reports from 1950 and specifically a report in The Philadelphia Inquirer called "Flying 'Saucer' Just Dissolves" where four police officers encountered a UFO debris that was described as evaporating with a purple glow leaving nothing. Paramount Pictures was also sued for this movie by the author Joseph Payne Brennan, who had written a short story published in Weird Tales Magazine in 1953 called "Slime" about a similar creature.

In a 2019 episode of The Twilight Zone entitled "Not All Men", a virulent star jelly apparently causes the male residents of a town to become psychotic.

In The End of Everything (2026) by M John Harrison, the substance is described as "some kind of biological gadget" released into Earth's oceans by extra-terrestrial invaders.

== Bibliography ==
- Belcher, Hilary; Swale, Erica (1984). "Catch a Falling Star". Folklore. 95 (2): 210–220. doi:10.1080/0015587X.1984.9716316.
- Fort, Charles (1919). The Book of the Damned.
- Gordon, Benjamin Lee (1959). Medieval and Renaissance medicine. Philosophical Library.
- Nieves-Rivera, Angel M. (2003). "The Fellowship of the Rings – UFO rings versus fairy rings". Skeptical Inquirer. 27 (6): 50–54.
- Schlüpmann, Martin (4 March 2007). "Laichballen auf Baumstümpfen, Baumstubben etc". Arbeitskreis Amphibien und Reptilien Nordrhein-Westfalen (in German). Archived from the original on 21 August 2007. Contains photo of slightly digested specimen.
