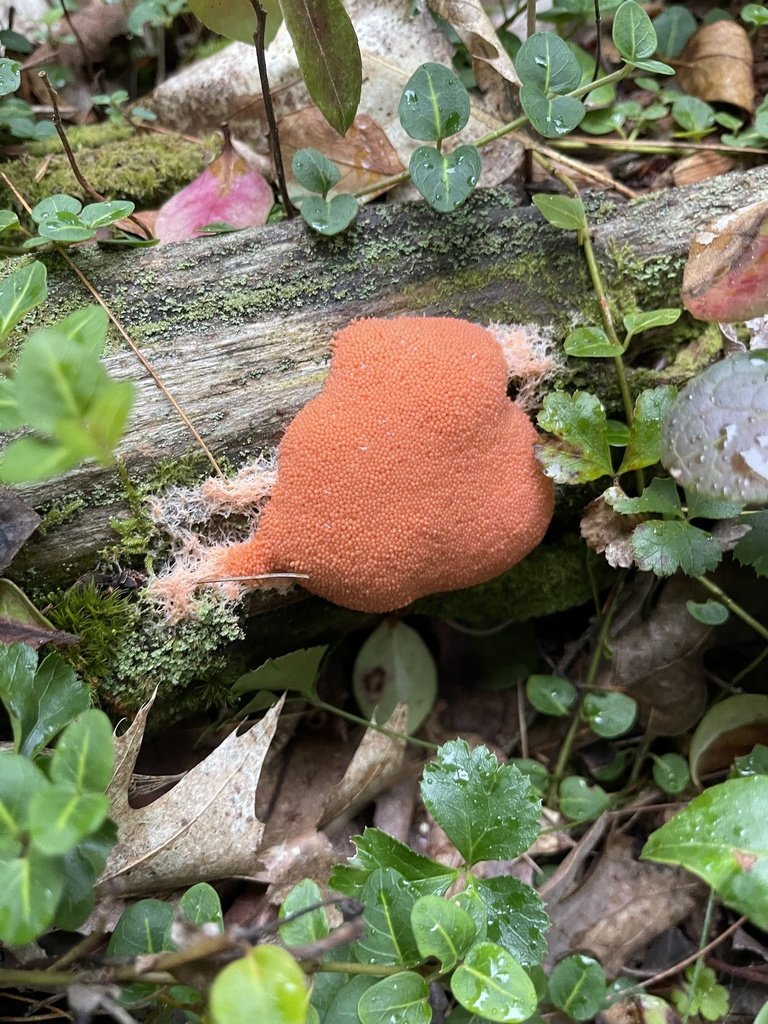
- Tubifera ferruginosa's pink-red pseudoaethalia

Scientific classification
- Domain: Eukaryota
- Clade: Amorphea
- Phylum: Amoebozoa
- Class: Myxogastria
- Order: Liceales
- Family: Tubiferaceae
- Genus: Tubifera
- Species: T. ferruginosa

Binomial name
- Tubifera ferruginosa (Batsch) J.F.Gmel., 1791

Subspecies
- Tubifera ferruginosa ssp. acutissima; Tubifera ferruginosa var. albostipitata; Tubifera ferruginosa var. complanata; Tubifera ferruginosa var. ferruginosa; Tubifera ferruginosa var. subungulata

Synonyms
- Stemonitis ferruginosa Batsch; Tubulifera arachnoidea

= Tubifera ferruginosa =

Species of slime mould

Tubifera ferruginosa, more commonly known as raspberry slime mold or red raspberry slime mold, is a species of slime mold in the class Myxogastria. It is one of the most widely known and distinct slime molds, being found throughout temperate regions of the world, primarily in Europe and North America.

== Description ==
T. ferruginosa is often found growing on damp rotten wood in temperate forests. It forms small, cushion-like "pseudoaethalia", or fruiting bodies from June to November that are bright red when young, and purple-brown when mature. These "pseudoaethalia" are different from the aethelia of other slime molds like Fuligo septica, because they are made of tightly bunched, gelatinous rods, or sporangia. Each individual sporangium is approximately 0.5 mm wide and 3 to 5 cm tall, while the width of the pseudoaethalia can reach 15 cm. The pseudoaethalia is anchored to a surface by the hypothallus, a spongy, raised structure that appears light in color.

== Name ==
The name "ferruginosa" comes from Ferrug-, meaning “rusty” or “rust”; and -osa, meaning “fullness” or “abundance”.

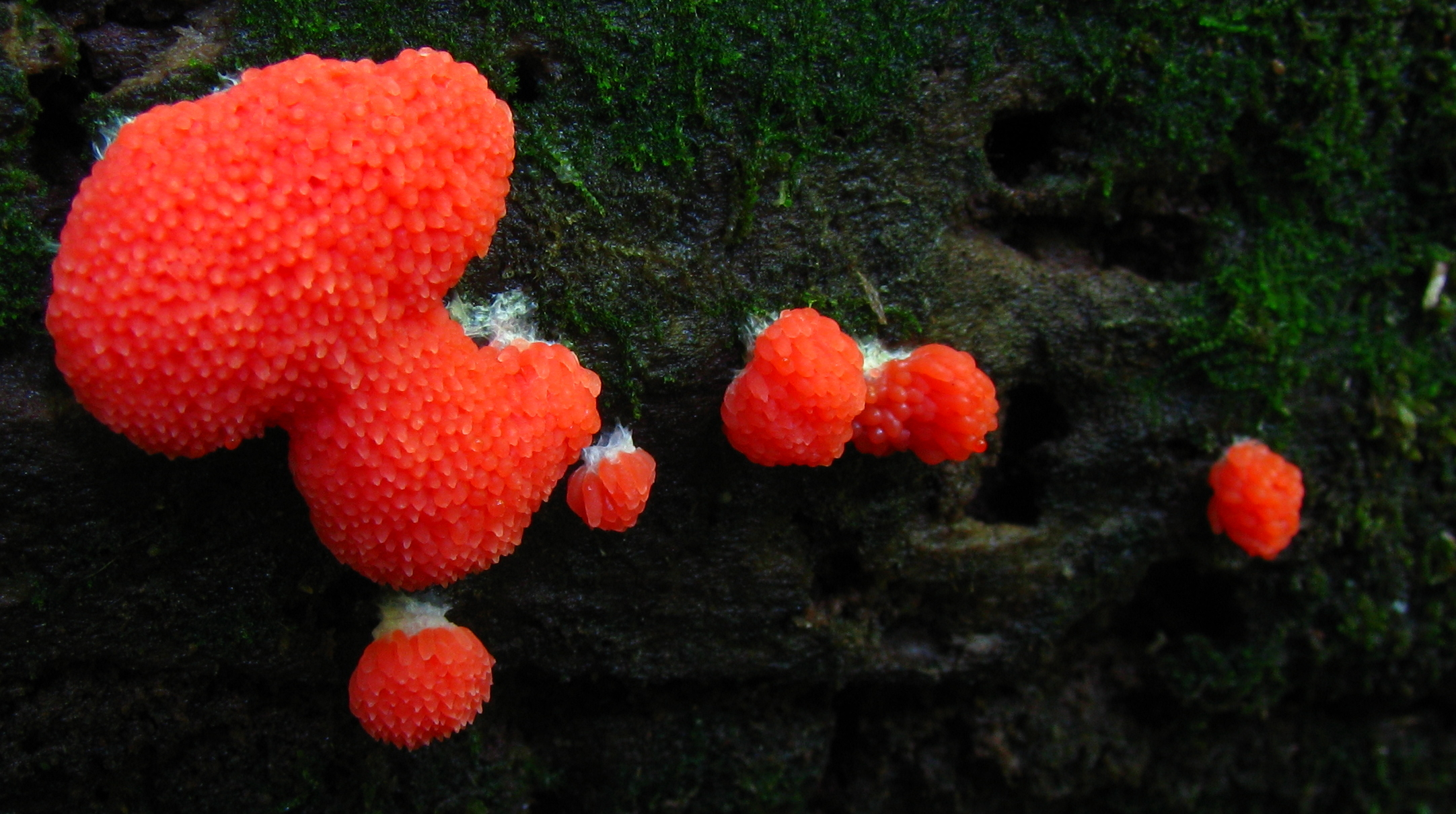
Example of bright-red fruiting bodies
