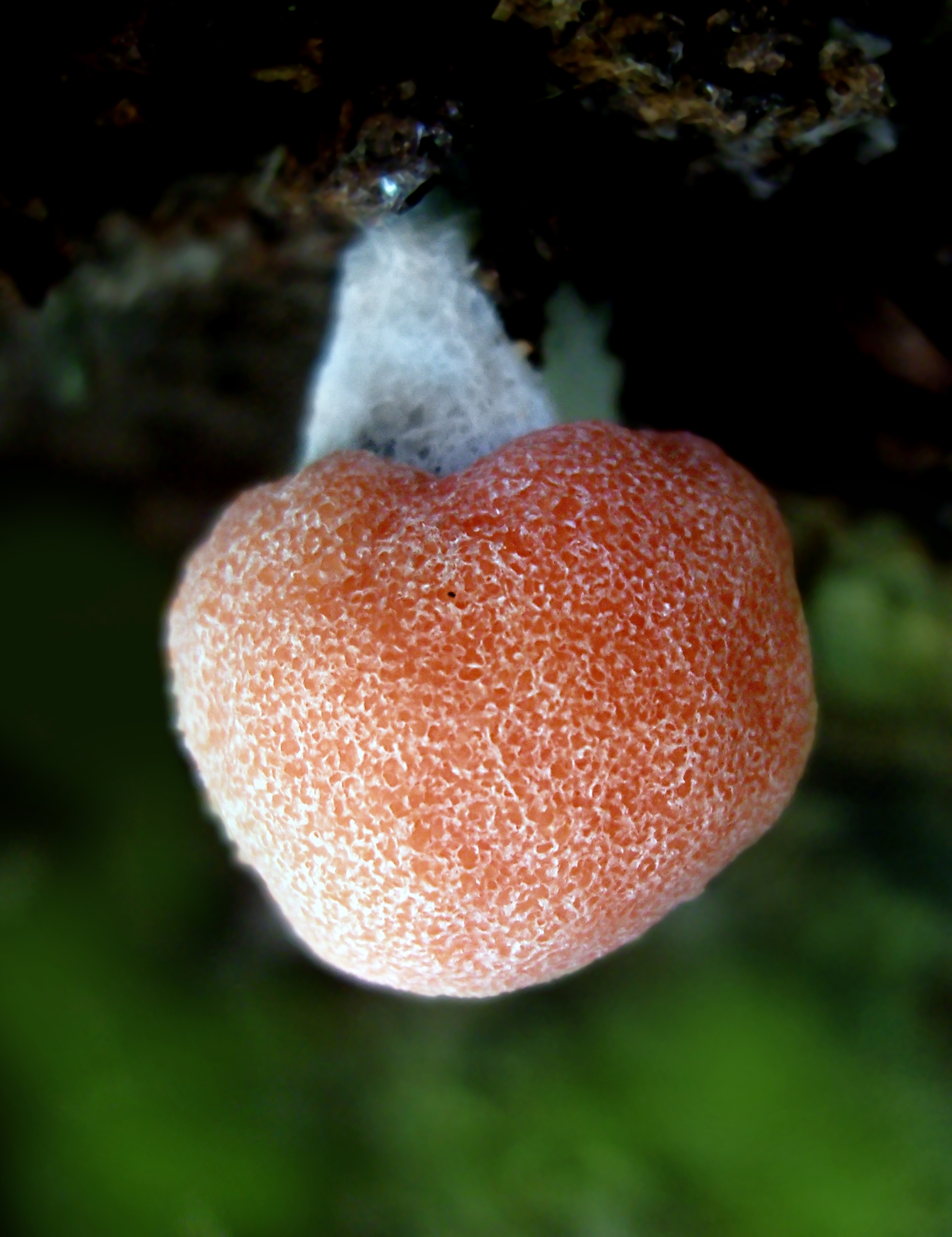

Scientific classification
- Domain: Eukaryota
- Phylum: Amoebozoa
- Class: Myxogastria
- Order: Liceales
- Family: Tubiferaceae
- Genus: Tubifera
- Species: T. dudkae

Binomial name
- Tubifera dudkae (Leontyev & G. Moreno) Leontyev, G. Moreno & Schnittler, 2015

= Tubifera dudkae =

Species of slime mould

Tubifera dudkae is a species of slime mold in the class Myxogastria. Unlike its relatives, T. dudkae does not form pseudoaethelia with distinct sporangia, or at least the sporangia are not visibly distinct or rod-shaped like other members of Tubifera. They are found growing on damp, dead wood in temperate forests, including where it was first documented in Ukraine. T. dudkae is found in mixed and coniferous forests across Europe and Asia.
