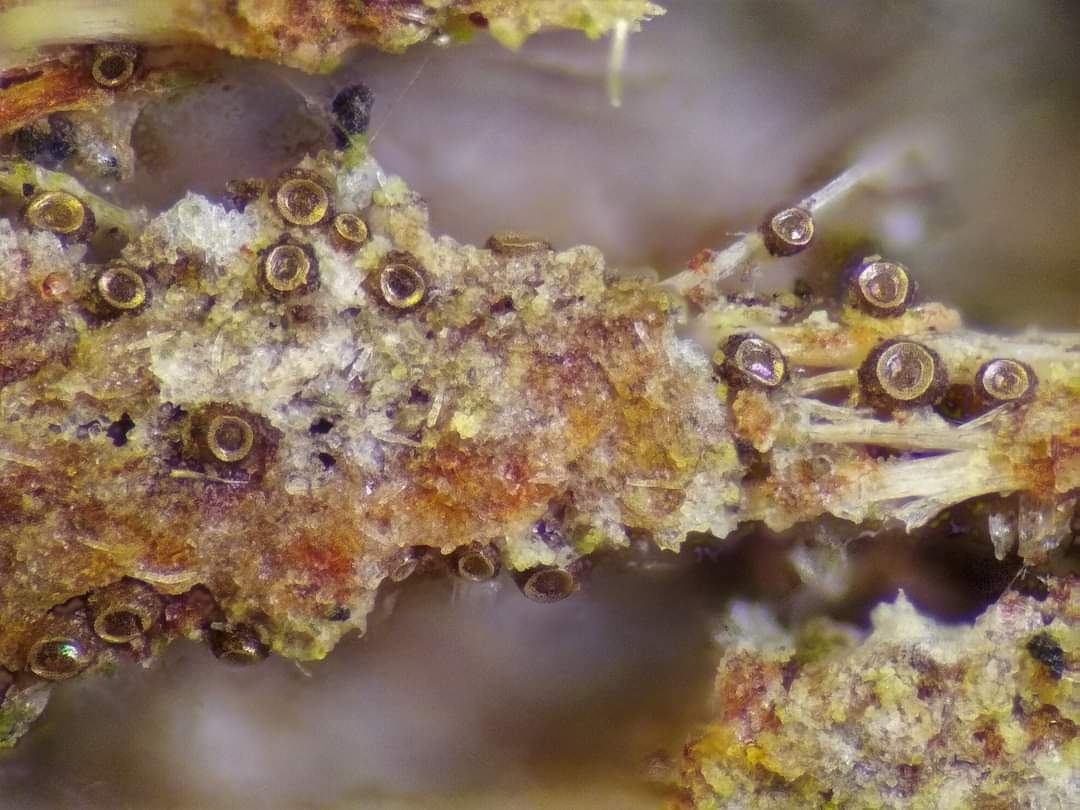
- Licea kleistobolus

Scientific classification
- Domain: Eukaryota
- Phylum: Amoebozoa
- Class: Myxogastria
- Order: Liceales
- Family: Liceaceae
- Genus: Licea; Schrad. (1797)

Type species
- Licea pusilla Schrad. (1797)

Synonyms
- Cylichnium F.G.Wallroth (1833); Hymenobolina H.Zukal (1893); Hymenobolus H.Zukal (1893); Kleistobolus C. Lippert (1894); Orcadella Wingate (1889); Pleiomorpha (N.E.Nannenga-Bremekamp) S.S.Dhillon (1978); Protoderma Rostafinski, (1874); Protodermium Rostafinski ex A.N. Berlese (1888); Protodermodium O.Kuntze (1891)

= Licea =

Genus of slime molds

Licea is a genus of slime molds belonging to the family Liceidae.

The genus was first described by Heinrich Schrader in 1797.

The genus has a cosmopolitan distribution.

Species:

- Licea inconspicua
- Licea kleistobolus
- Licea parasitica
- Licea pusilla
