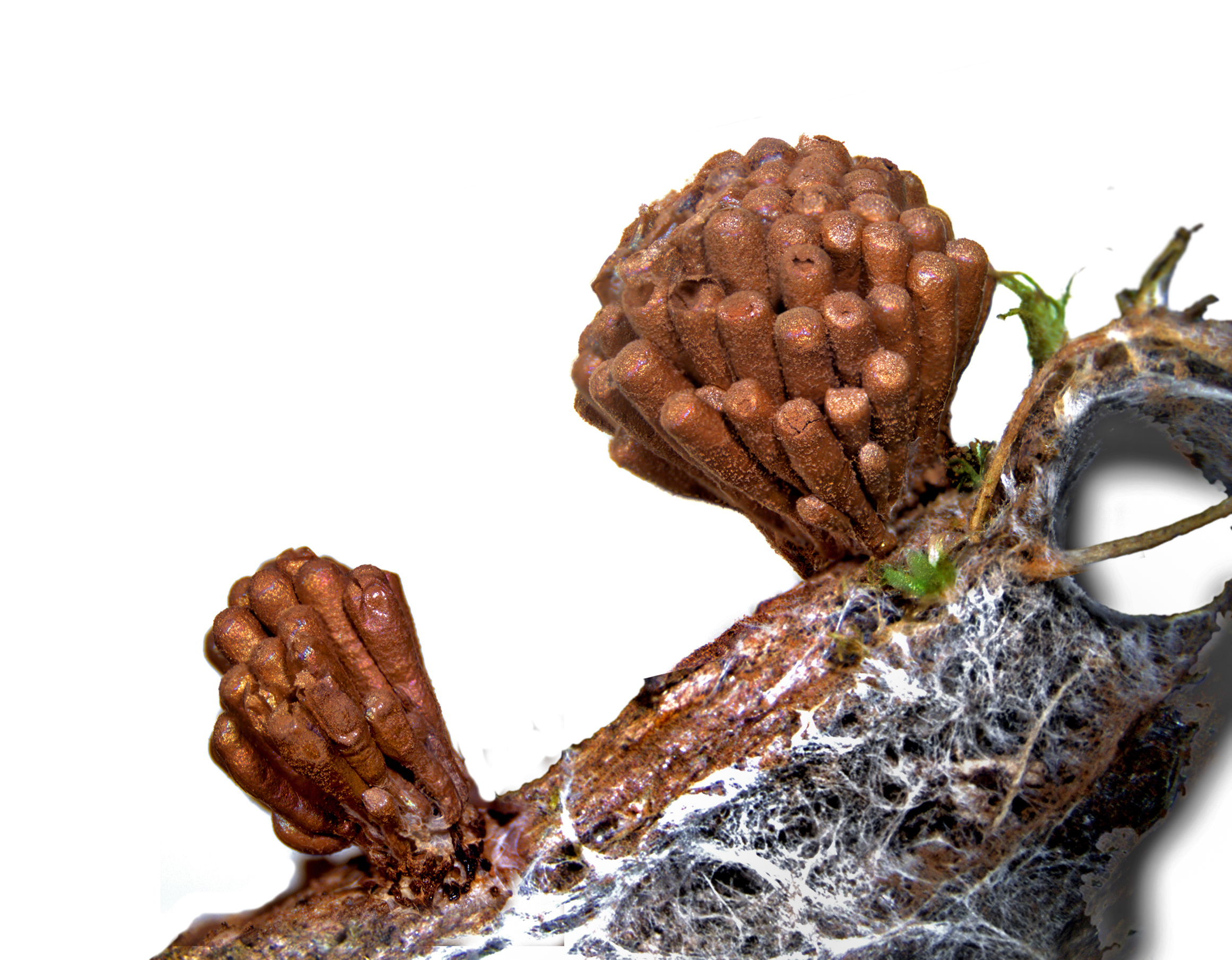

Scientific classification
- Domain: Eukaryota
- Clade: Amorphea
- Phylum: Amoebozoa
- Class: Myxogastria
- Order: Liceales
- Family: Tubiferaceae
- Genus: Tubifera
- Species: T. corymbosa

Binomial name
- Tubifera corymbosa Leontyev, Schnittler, S.L. Stephenson & L.M. Walker, 2015

= Tubifera corymbosa =

Species of slime mould

Tubifera corymbosa is a species of slime mold in the class Myxogastria. It forms "pseudoaethelia" (mass of sporangia) that are rust-red in color. Each sporangia is distinctly larger than those of other related species. They are found growing on damp, dead wood on the forest floor. T. corymbosa is found in tropical forests of Central America.

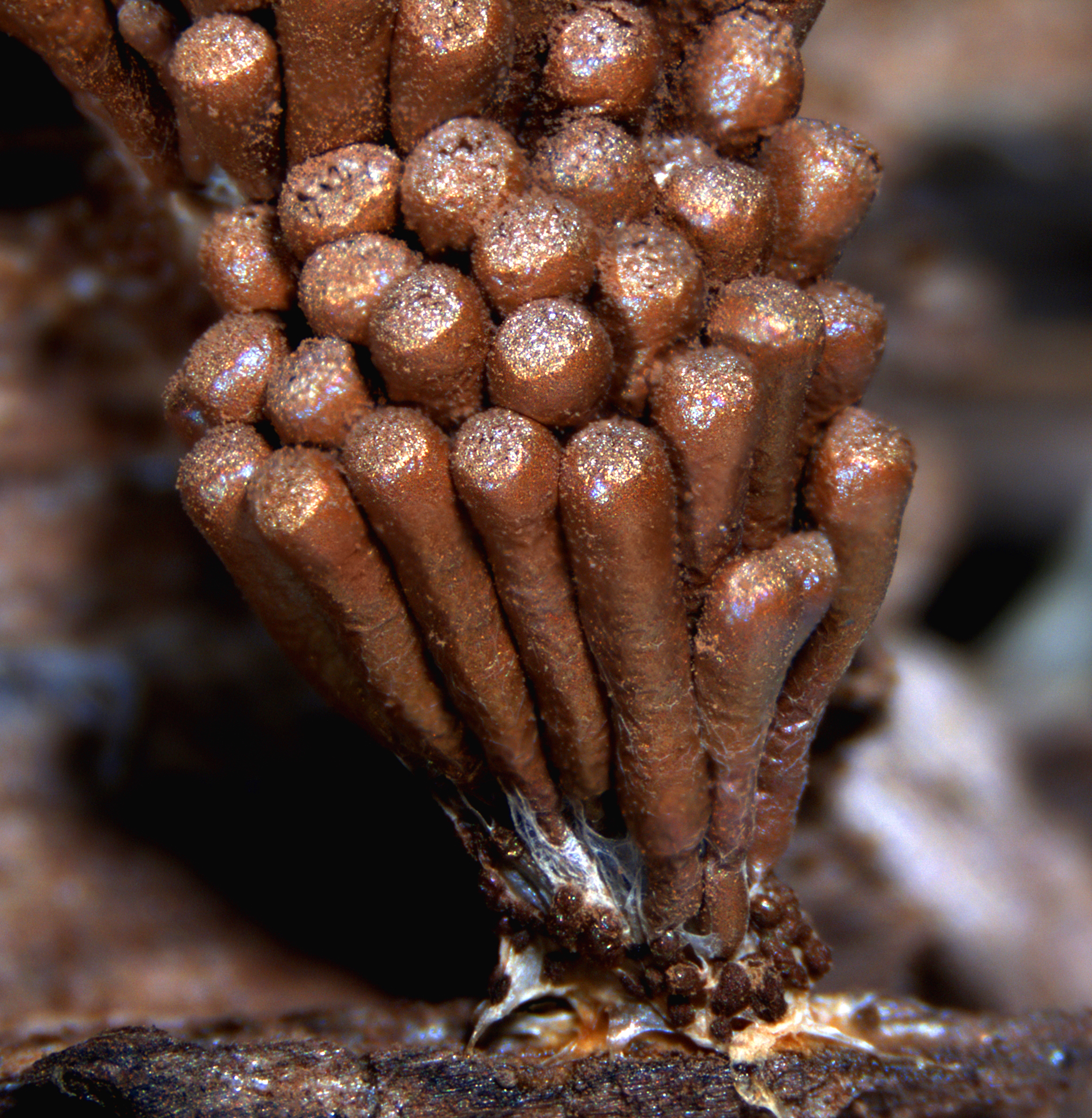
Example of large, rust-colored sporangia
