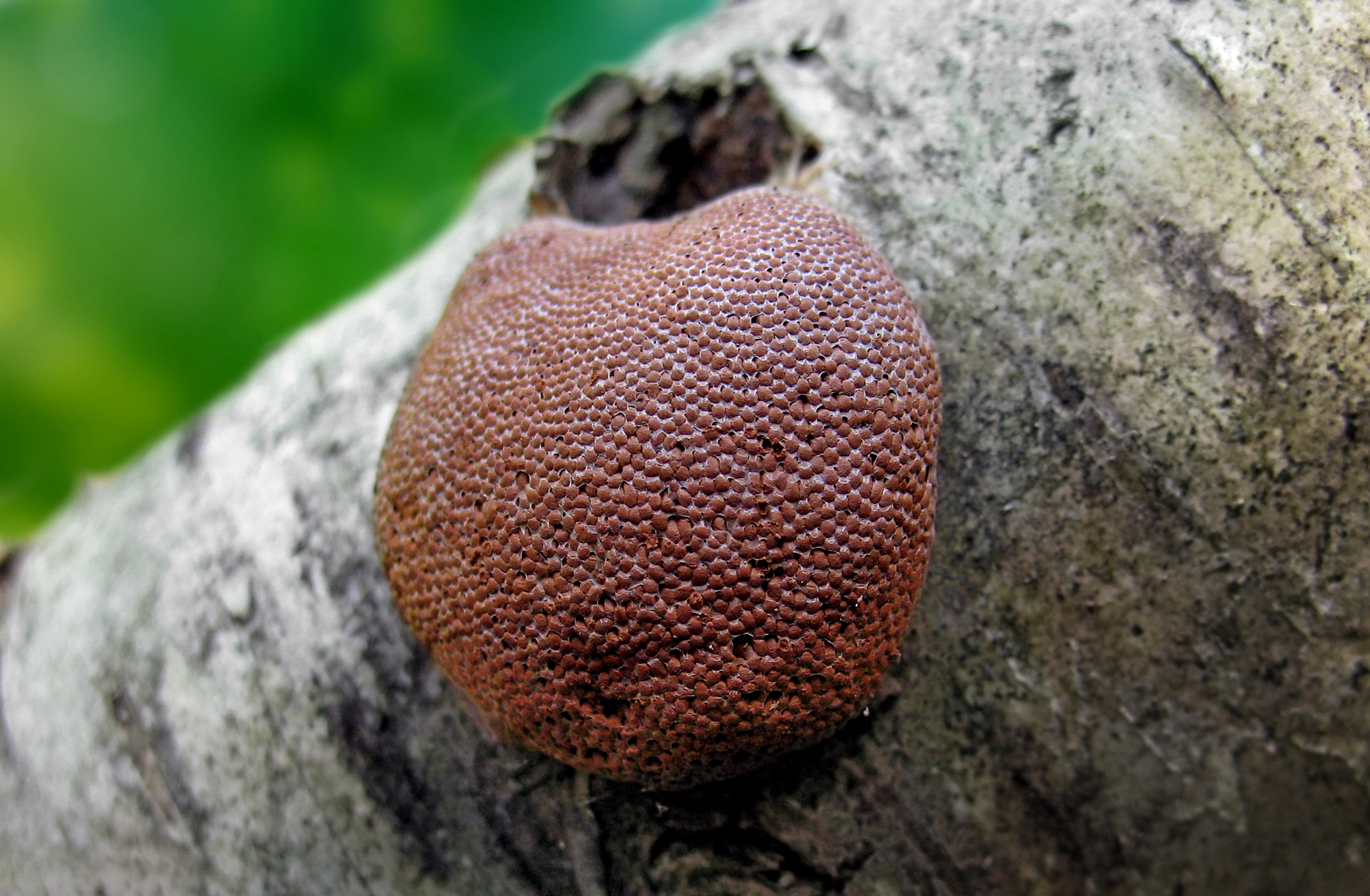

Scientific classification
- Domain: Eukaryota
- Phylum: Amoebozoa
- Class: Myxogastria
- Order: Liceales
- Family: Tubiferaceae
- Genus: Tubifera
- Species: T. applanata

Binomial name
- Tubifera applanata D.V. Leontyev & K.A. Fefelov, 2012

= Tubifera applanata =

Species of slime mould

Tubifera applanata is a species of slime mold in the class Myxogastria. It forms 2 to 7 cm wide "pseudoaethelia" (mass of sporangia) that are rust-red in color. They are found growing on damp, dead wood in temperate forests, including where it was first documented, which was on a log of Pinus sylvestris in Ukraine.
