= Licea pusilla =

Scientific classification
- Domain: Eukaryota
- Phylum: Amoebozoa
- Class: Myxogastria
- Family: Liceidae
- Genus: Licea
- Species: L. pusilla

Binomial name
- Licea pusilla Schrad. (1797)
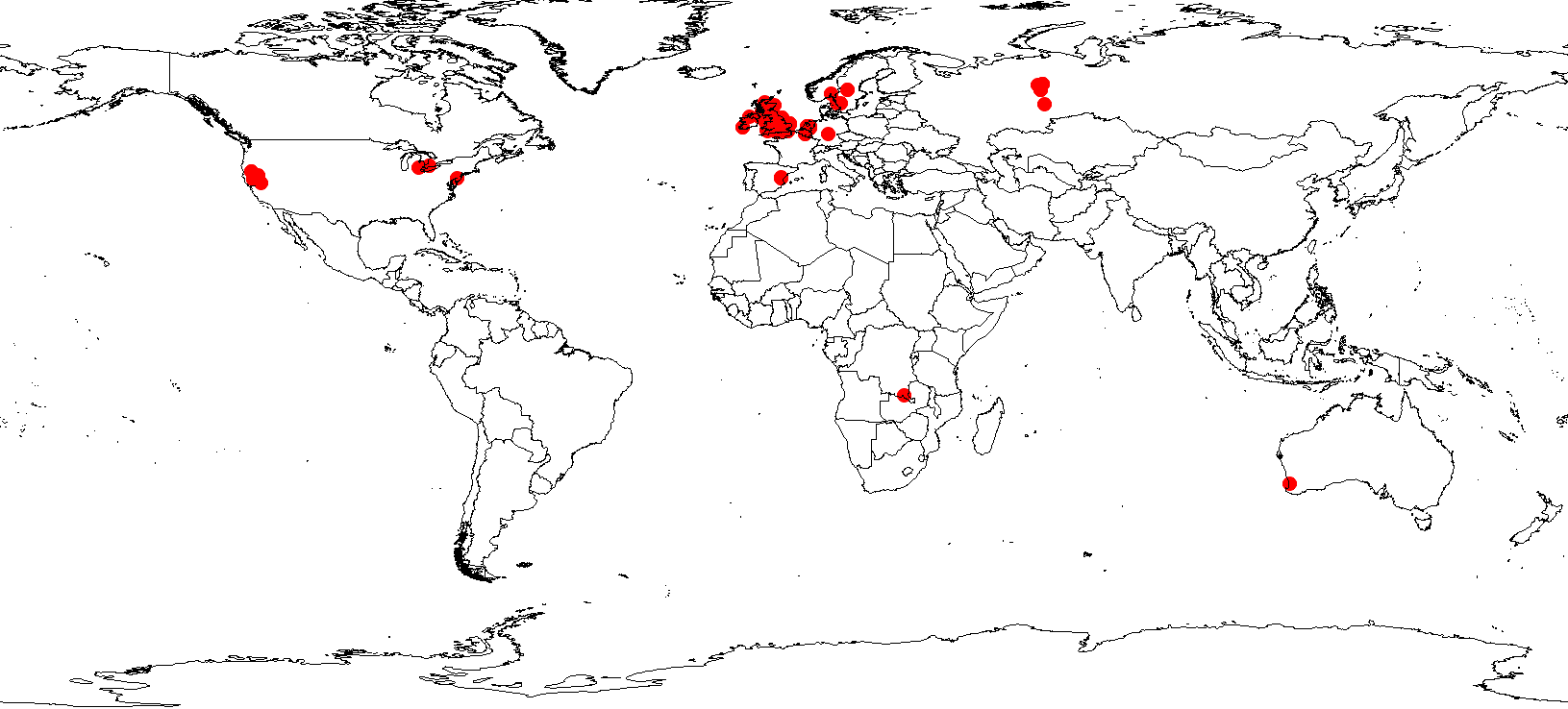
- Occurrence data from GBIF

Synonyms
- Protoderma pusillum (Schrad.) Rostaf. (1874); Protodermium pusillum (Schrad.) Rostaf. (1888); Protodermodium pusillum (Schrad.) Kuntze (1891); Tubulina pusilla (Schrad.) Poir. (1808)

Species of slime mould

Licea pusilla is a species of slime mould in the family Liceidae, first described in 1797 by Heinrich Schrader, and is the type species of the genus, Licea. It was described from a specimen collected in Germany from rotten wood in a pine forest.
