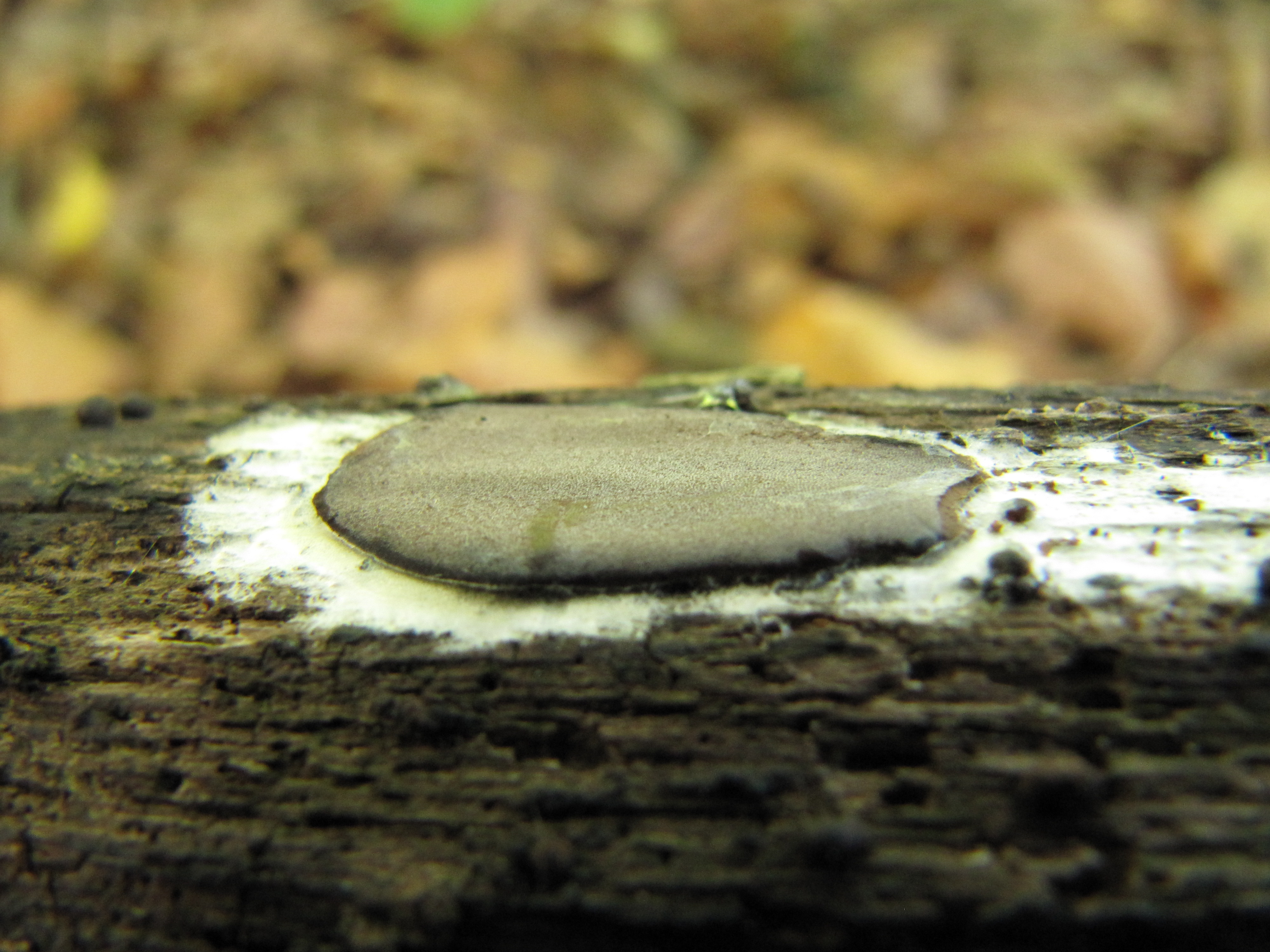
- Dictydiaethalium plumbeum

Scientific classification
- Domain: Eukaryota
- Phylum: Amoebozoa
- Class: Myxogastria
- Order: Liceales
- Family: Reticulariaceae
- Genus: Dictydiaethalium; Rostafiński 1873

Type species
- Dictydiaethalium plumbeum (Schumacher) Rostafiński 1837 ex Lister 1894

Species
- D. dictyosporangium Zhang & Li 2015; D. dictyosporum Nann.-Bremek. 1966; D. plumbeum (Schumacher 1803) Rostafiński 1837 ex Lister 1894

Synonyms
- Clathroptychium Rostafiński 1875; Ophiuridium Hazslinszky 1877

= Dictydiaethalium =

Genus of slime moulds

Dictydiaethalium is a genus of slime molds composed of D. plumbeum and D. dictyosporum.
