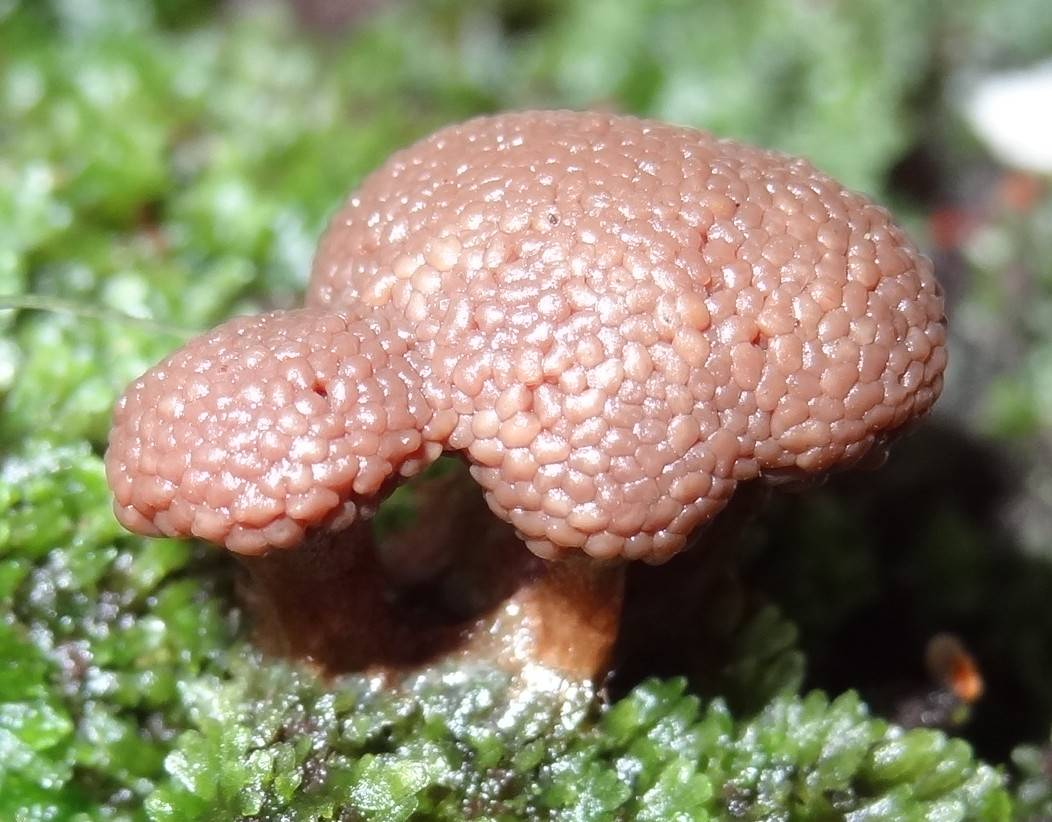

Scientific classification
- Domain: Eukaryota
- Clade: Amorphea
- Phylum: Amoebozoa
- Class: Myxogastria
- Order: Liceales
- Family: Tubiferaceae
- Genus: Tubifera
- Species: T. microsperma

Binomial name
- Tubifera microsperma (Berk. & M.A.Curtis) G.W.Martin, 1947

Synonyms
- Licea microsperma Berk. & M.A.Curtis, 1873; Tubulifera microsperma (Berk. & M.A.Curtis) Lado, 2001

= Tubifera microsperma =

Species of slime mould

Tubifera microsperma is a species of slime mold in the class Myxogastria.
