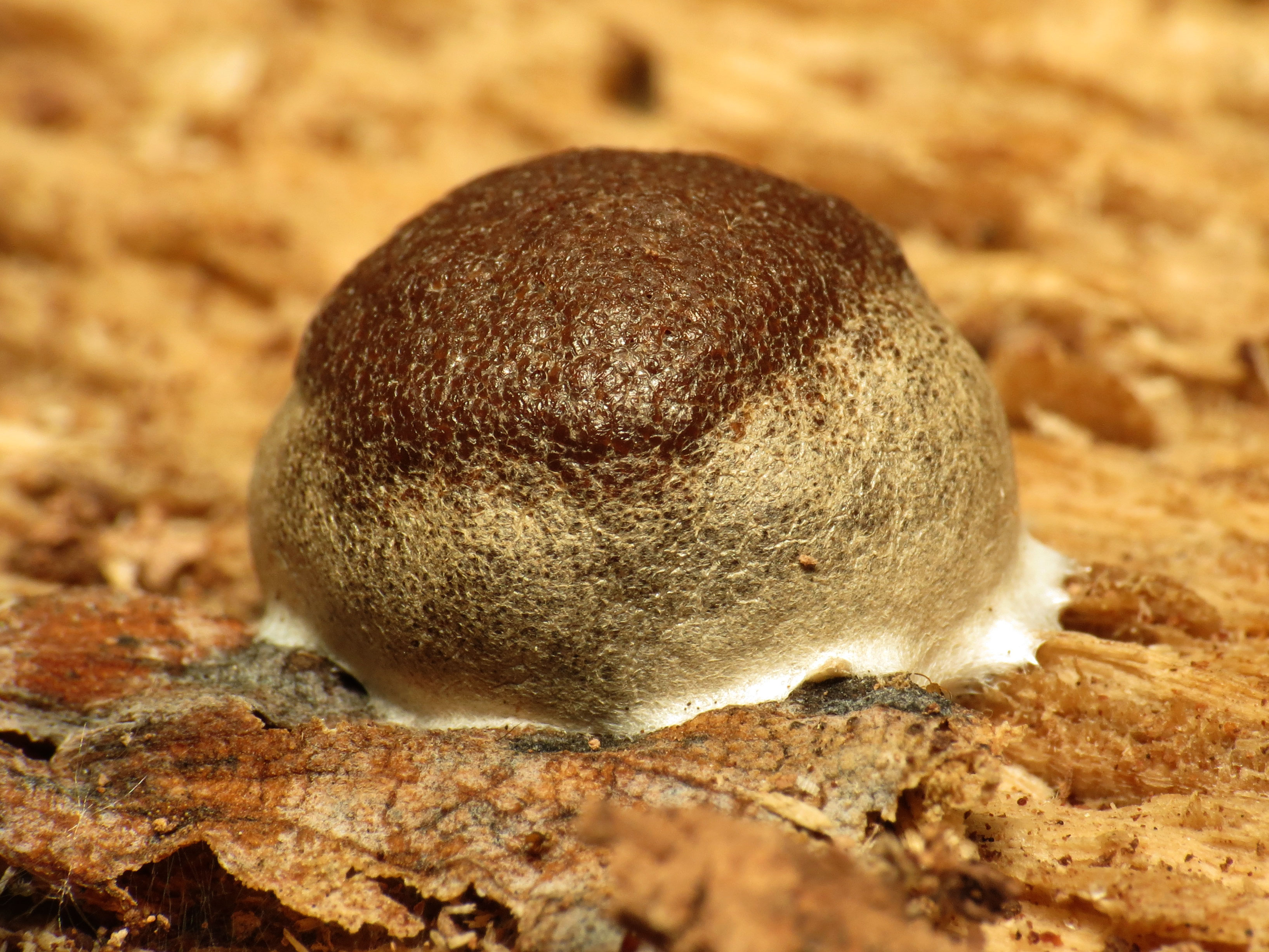
- Enteridium sp. found in Rock Creek Park, Washington, D.C.

Scientific classification
- Domain: Eukaryota
- Phylum: Amoebozoa
- Class: Myxogastria
- Order: Trichiales
- Family: Dianemataceae
- Genus: Enteridium; Ehrenb., 1819

= Enteridium =

Genus of slime mould

Enteridium is a genus of slime molds belonging to the family Dianemataceae. It was formerly included in the Reticulariaceae and in some sources is listed as a synonym of Reticularia Bulliard, 1788, however recent work confirms it as a separate genus and removes it from that family (and the latter's containing order) and places it in the order Trichiales, family Dianemataceae.

== Species ==
Species via Mycobank:

- Enteridium antarcticum
- Enteridium atrum
- Enteridium aureum
- Enteridium cinereum
- Enteridium intermedium
- Enteridium japonicum
- Enteridium juranum
- Enteridium liceoides
- Enteridium lobatum
- Enteridium lycoperdon
- Enteridium macrosporum
- Enteridium minutum
- Enteridium olivaceum
- Enteridium rostrupii
- Enteridium rozeanum
- Enteridium rubiginosum
- Enteridium simulans
- Enteridium splendens
