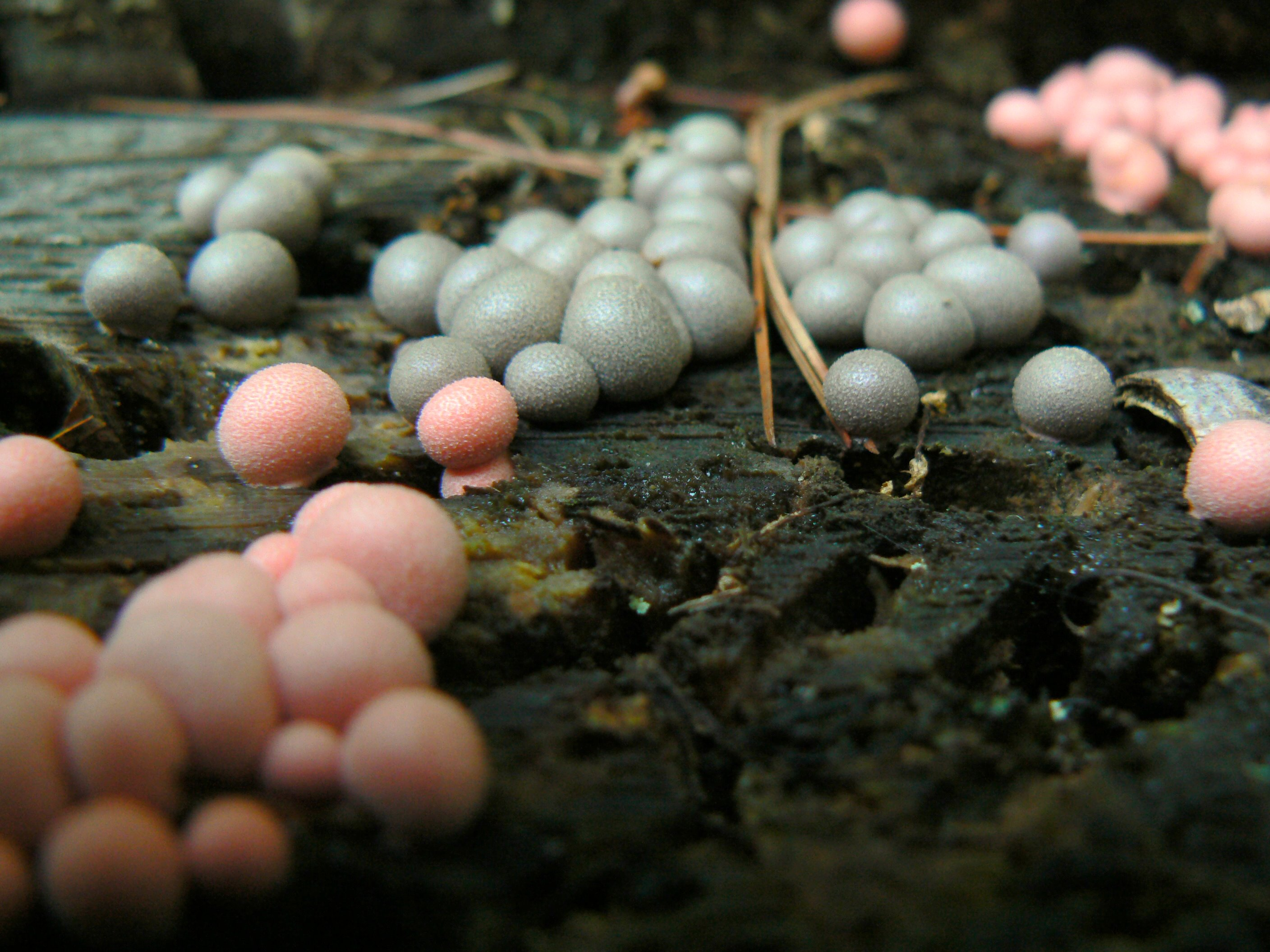
- Lycogala epidendrum

Scientific classification
- Domain: Eukaryota
- Phylum: Amoebozoa
- Class: Myxogastria
- Order: Liceales
- Family: Tubiferaceae
- Genus: Lycogala; Adans., 1763

Type species
- Lycoperdon epidendrum J.C.Buxb. ex L., 1753

Species
- L. confusa Nann.-Bremek. ex Ing 1999; L. conica Persoon 1801; L. epidendra (von Linné 1753) Fries 1829; L. exigua Morgan 1893; L. flavofusca (Ehrenb. 1818) Rostafinski 1873; L. fuscoviolacea Onsberg 1972; L. leiospora Reichardt 1866

Synonyms
- Antonigeppia Kuntze 1898; Dermodium Rostafinski 1875 non Link 1809; Diphtherium Ehrenberg 1818; Galoperdon Wiggers 1780; Lycoperdon Tourn. ex von Linné 1759 non Pers. 1794 non Micheli 1729; Verrucosia Teng 1932

= Lycogala =

Genus of slime moulds

Lycogala is a genus of Amoebozoa, including the species Lycogala epidendrum. The genus has a cosmopolitan distribution and contains at least 43 known species, with many still undescribed.
