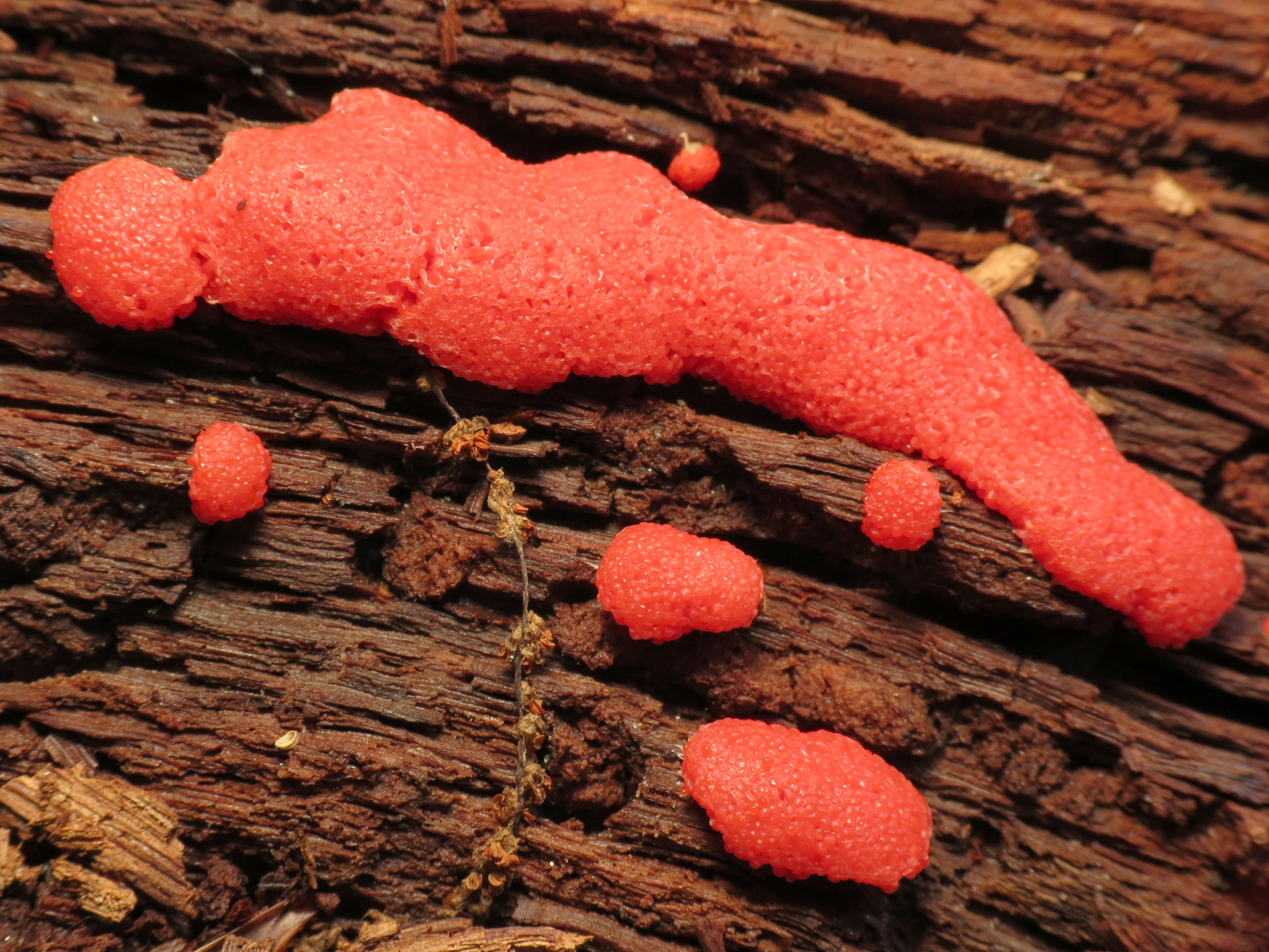
- Tubifera ferruginosa

Scientific classification
- Domain: Eukaryota
- Phylum: Amoebozoa
- Class: Myxogastria
- Order: Liceales
- Family: Tubiferaceae
- Genus: Tubifera; G.F.Gmel., 1792

Type species
- Tubifera ferruginosa (Batsch) J.F.Gmel., 1791

= Tubifera =

Genus of slime moulds

Tubifera is a genus of slime moulds from the class Myxogastria. The genus comprises 12 species.

== Description ==
The fruit-bodies are aethalia formed from numerous, usually densely packed sporangia. The oblong sporangia are ochre, pink or red to dark brown and may be shiny or shimmering. They open at the tip to release the spores.

The hypothallus is spongy, occasionally raised to a stem-like, stock, dark-coloured structure or also, on Tubifera bombarda, soft and film-like thin. The membranous, single layered peridium outlasts the below half. A pseudocapillitium may or may not be present. The spores are light yellow to reddish-brown.

== Habitat ==
Tubifera ferruginosa and Tubifera microsperma are more widespread and common than the other species from this genus. All species, except Tubifera casparyii, are also common in the tropics.

== Classification ==
The genus was circumscribed in 1873 by Józef Thomasz Rostafiński. The type species is Tubifera ferruginosa, first characterized as a Stemonitis species.

=== Species ===
The genus comprises the following 12 species:

- Tubifera applanata
- Tubifera casparyii
- Tubifera corymbosa
- Tubifera dictyoderma
- Tubifera dimorphotheca
- Tubifera dudkae
- Tubifera ferruginosa
- Tubifera magna
- Tubifera microsperma
- Tubifera montana
- Tubifera papillata
- Tubifera pseudomicrosperma
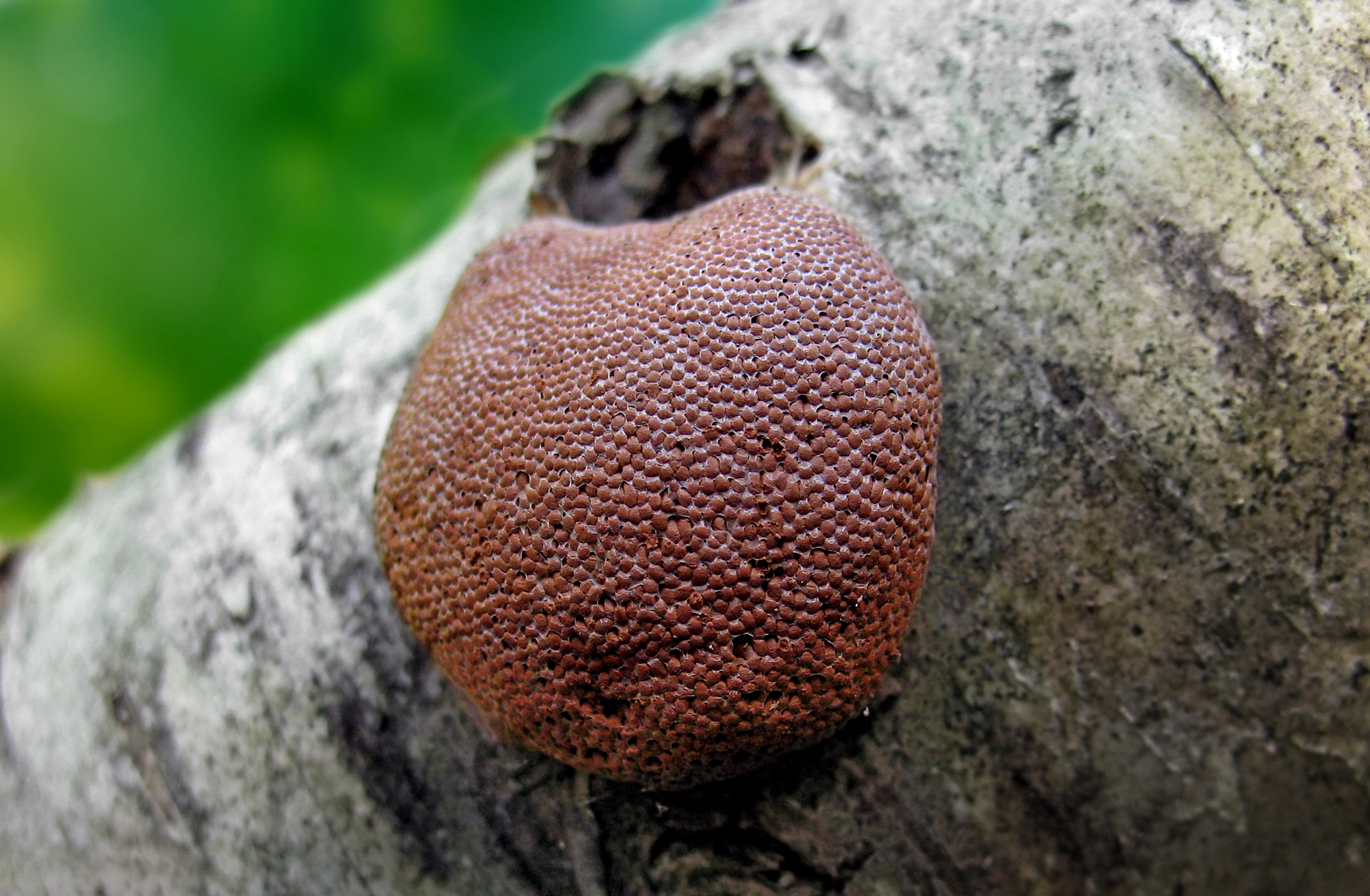
Tubifera applanata

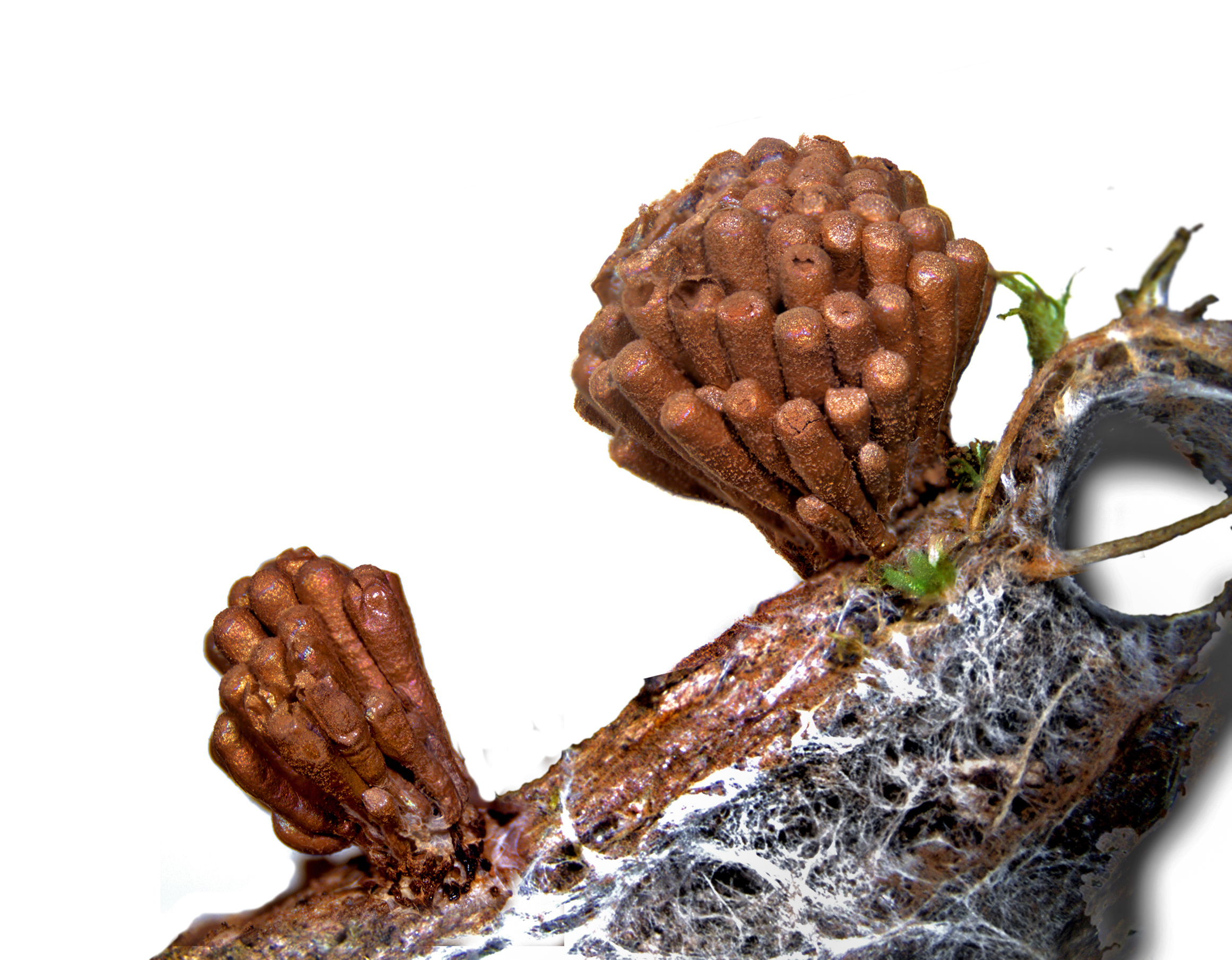
Tubifera corymbosa

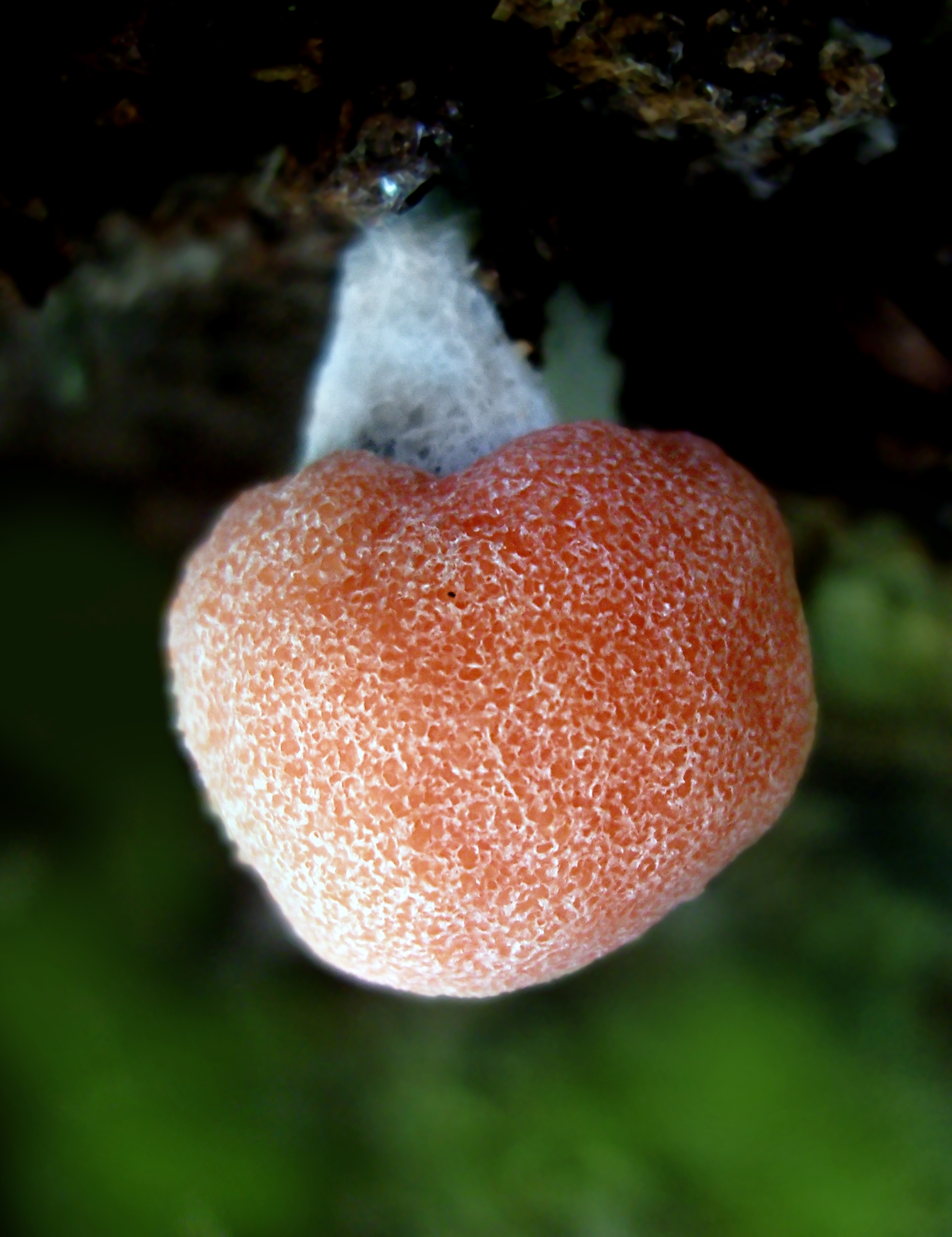
Tubifera dudkae

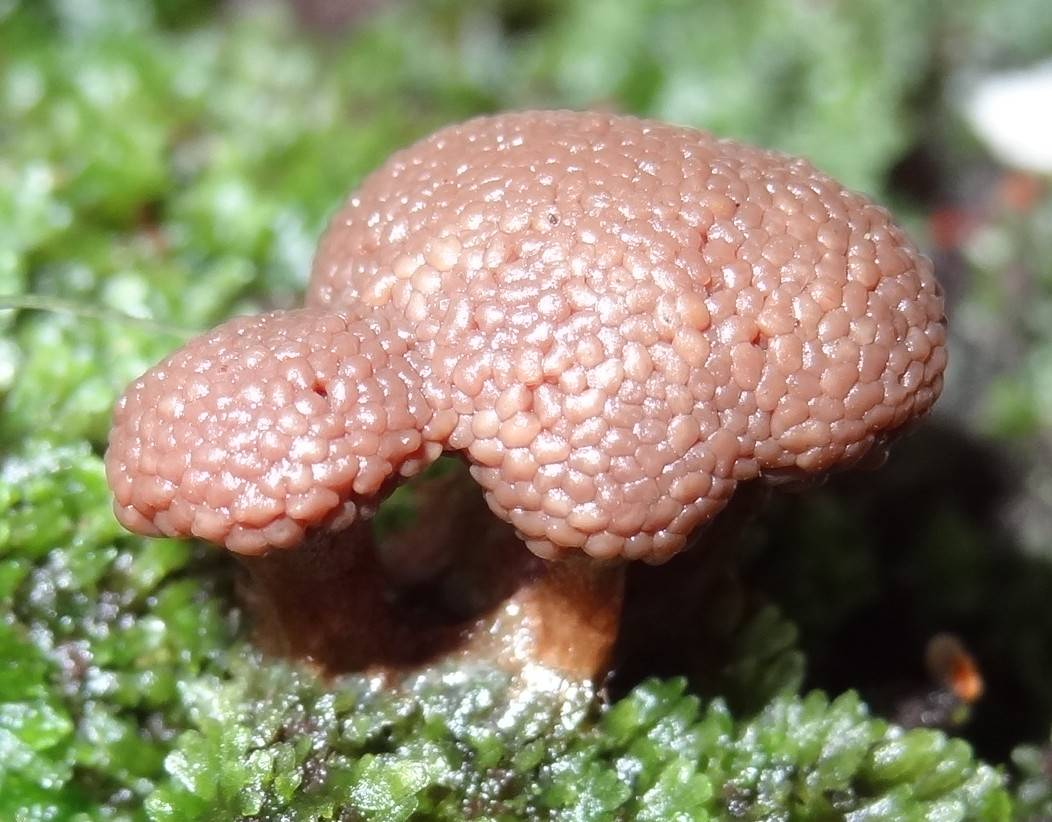
Tubifera microsperma

=== Previously included species ===
- Alwisia bombarda (as Tubifera bombarda)
