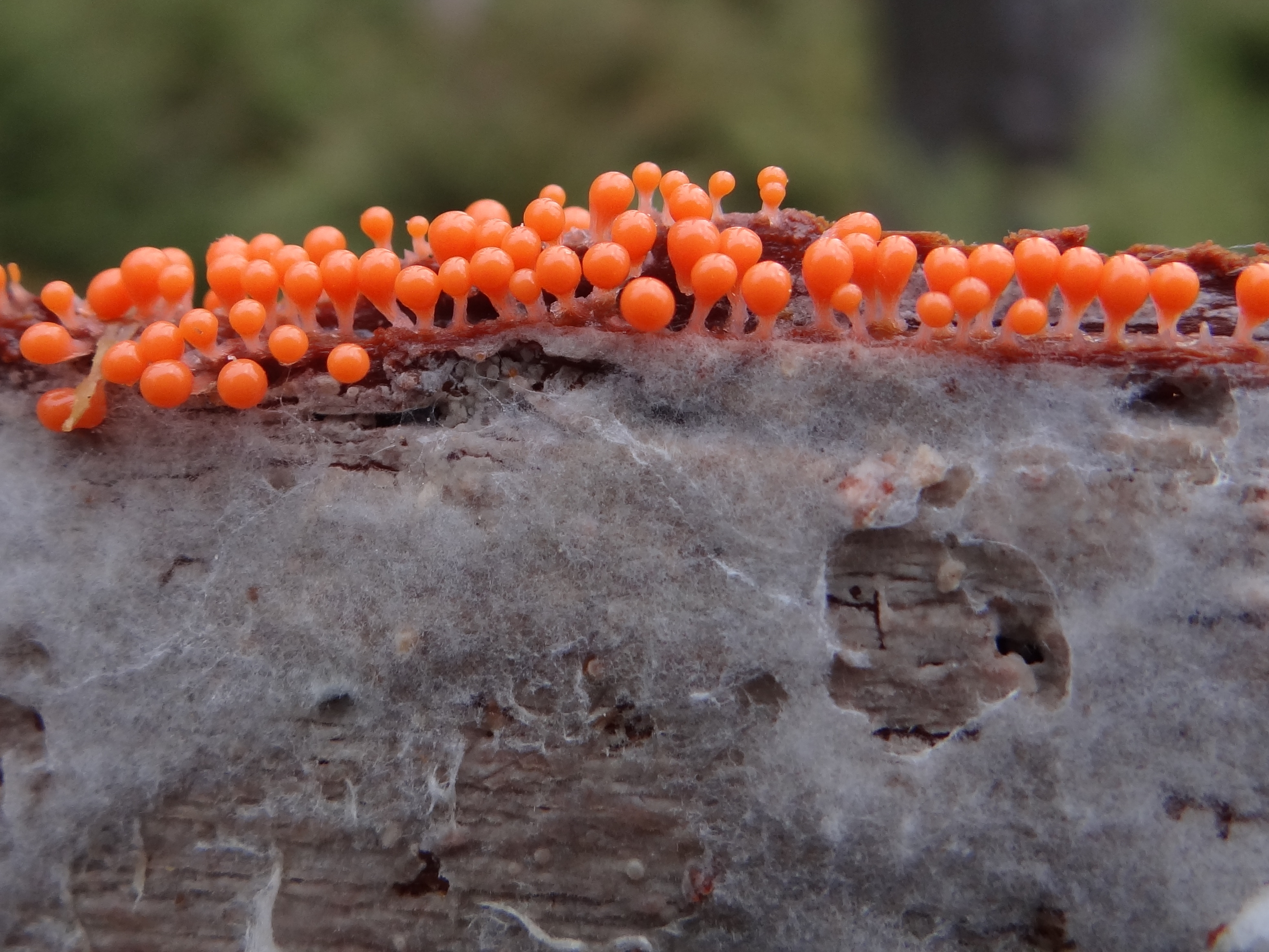
- Trichia decipiens plasmodium and sporangia on a tree trunk

Scientific classification
- Domain: Eukaryota
- Clade: Amorphea
- Phylum: Amoebozoa
- Class: Myxogastria
- Order: Trichiales
- Family: Trichiaceae
- Genus: Trichia
- Species: T. decipiens

Binomial name
- Trichia decipiens (Pers.) T. Macbr.

= Trichia decipiens =

Species of slime mould

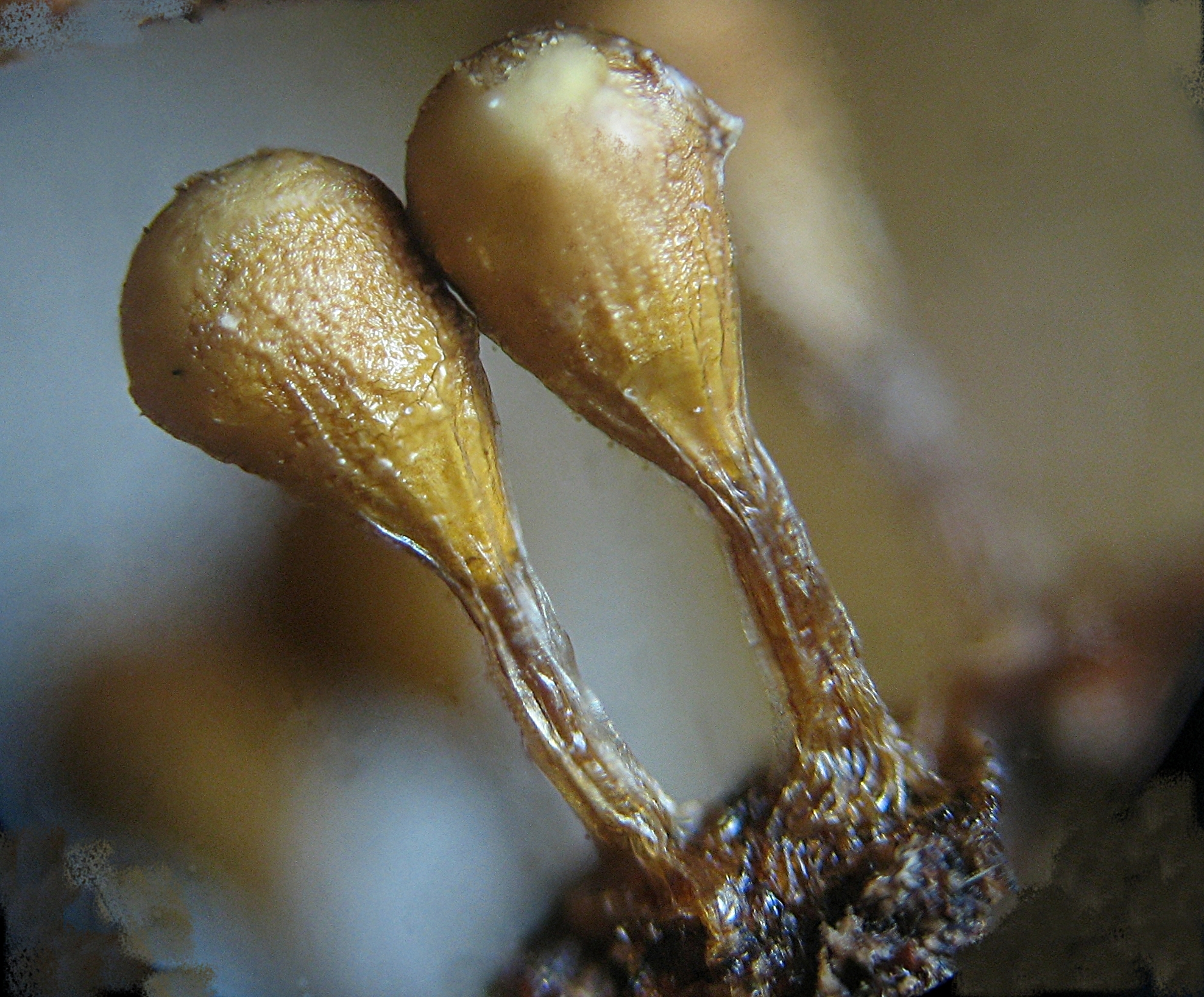
Trichia decipiens, fruiting

Trichia decipiens is a worldwide widespread slime mould species from the order Trichiida.

== Characteristics ==
The plasmodium is white, becoming pink to red at maturity. The small- to large-group-forming fruiting bodies are shiny olive to yellow-olive or brown, and bear mainly stalked, rarely sessile sporangia. These are conical to peak-shaped and are up to 3 mm high and 0.6 to 0.8 (rarely up to 1.3) mm wide.

The shiny, membraneous hypothallus is wide, and pale to brown in colour. The cylindrical stem is wrinkled, dark brown at the base and becoming gradually lighter toward the top, and is filled with up to 1 mm-long, spore-like bodies. The solid or membranous peridium is yellow, often transparent on thin areas, thickened and deeper beneath, surviving as an initially shallow calyculus.

The capillitium from the mass is olive to olive-yellow and is composed of non-overgrown, simple or branched, deeply olive-yellow, 5 to 6 μm thick elaters, which stand in relief as three to five overhanging spiral strands and become pointed towards the end. The spore mass is olive-yellow to olive, in transmitted light appearing pallidly olive-yellow, occasionally paler. The spores are 10 to 13 μm in diameter, and have a largely reticulated surface, the remainder being densely warty or prickly.

== Habitat and ecology ==
The species has a worldwide distribution. T. decipiens slime molds live on the deadwood of conifers and broadleaf trees year-round. The slime mould is associated with, among others, species of the genera Trichia, Arcyria and Cribraria as well as Lycogala epidendrum and Stemonitis typhina.

== Classification ==
Trichia decipiens was first described as Arcyria decipiens in 1795 by Christiaan Hendrik Persoon on the basis of a 1778 collection from a forest in Chemnitz. Macbride reclassified the species in 1899 into the genus Trichia.
