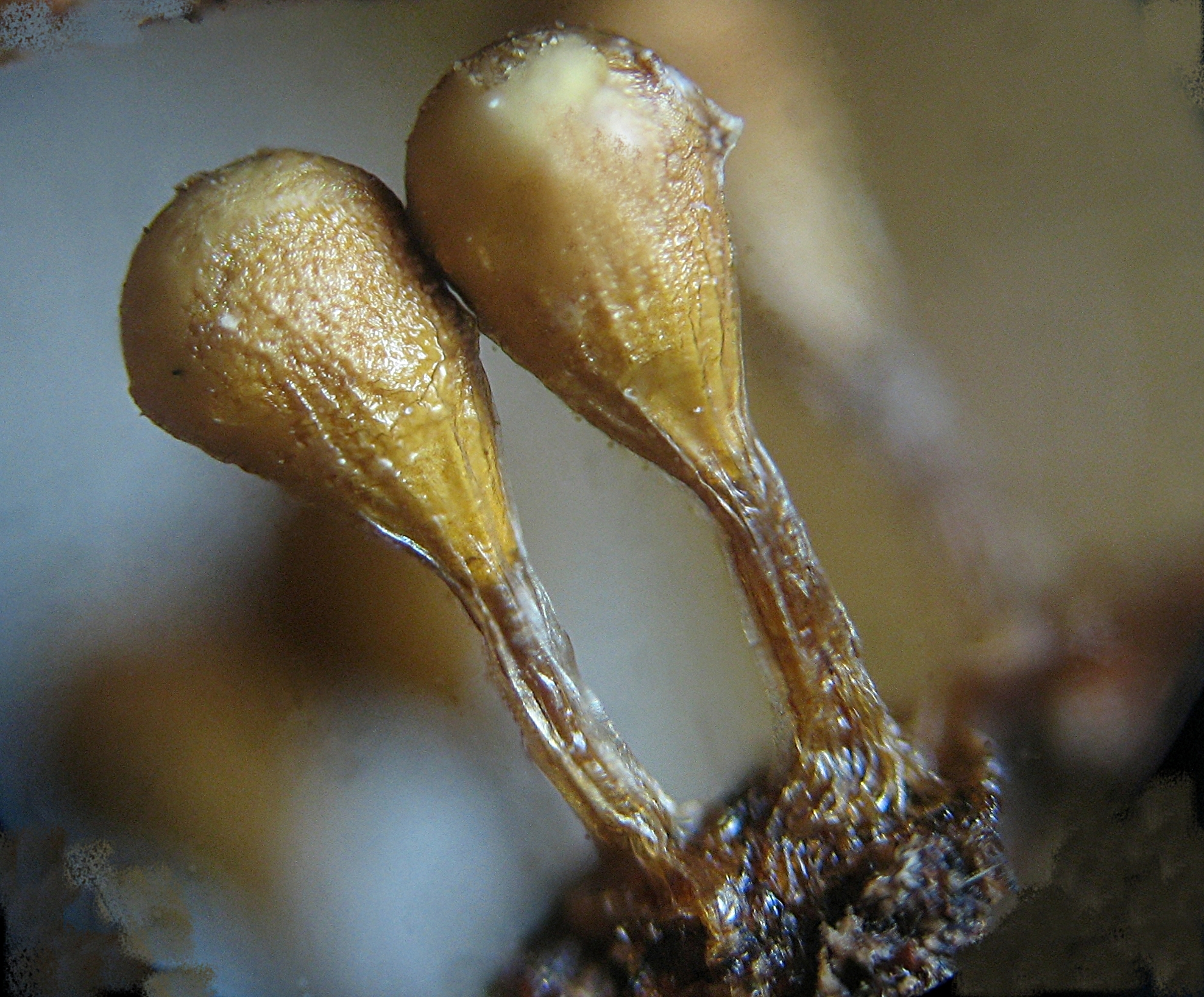
- Trichia decipiens, fruiting

Scientific classification
- Domain: Eukaryota
- Phylum: Amoebozoa
- Class: Myxogastria
- Order: Trichiales
- Family: Trichiaceae
- Genus: Trichia; Haller, 1768

Type species
- Trichia ovata Pers., 1796

= Trichia =

Genus of slime moulds

Trichia is a genus of slime molds in the family Trichiaceae. As of June 2015, there are 34 species in the genus.

== Species ==
- Trichia affinis
- Trichia agaves
- Trichia alpina
- Trichia antartica
- Trichia botrytis
- Trichia brevicapillata
- Trichia brimsiorum
- Trichia brunnea
- Trichia conglobata
- Trichia contorta
- Trichia crateriformis
- Trichia crenulata
- Trichia decipiens
- Trichia elaterensis
- Trichia erecta
- Trichia favoginea
- Trichia fimicola
- Trichia flavicoma
- Trichia heteroelaterum
- Trichia huizhongii
- Trichia lutescens
- Trichia macbridei
- Trichia microspora
- Trichia mirabilis
- Trichia munda
- Trichia nodosa
- Trichia papillata
- Trichia persimilis
- Trichia scabra
- Trichia sordida
- Trichia subfusca
- Trichia subretispora
- Trichia varia
- Trichia verrucosa
