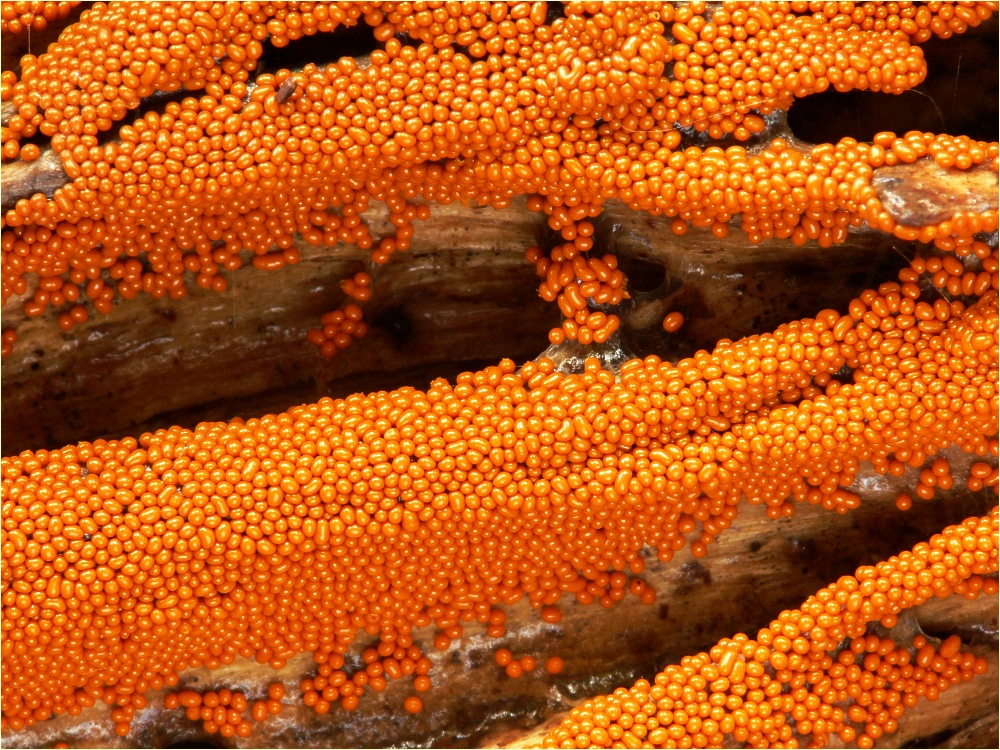
- Trichia varia

Scientific classification
- Domain: Eukaryota
- Phylum: Amoebozoa
- Class: Myxogastria
- Order: Trichiales
- Family: Trichiaceae
- Genus: Trichia
- Species: T. varia

Binomial name
- Trichia varia (Pers. ex J.F. Gmel.) Pers.

= Trichia varia =

Species of slime mould

Trichia varia is a type of slime mold in the order Trichiida, first described by Johann Friedrich Gmelin in 1794. Its sporangium measures 0.6 to 0.9 millimeters, and its stalk 0.1 to 0.5 millimeters. It is a pale orange color, distinguished by other members of its genus by having two spiral bands on its elaters. It is distributed throughout various parts of the world.
