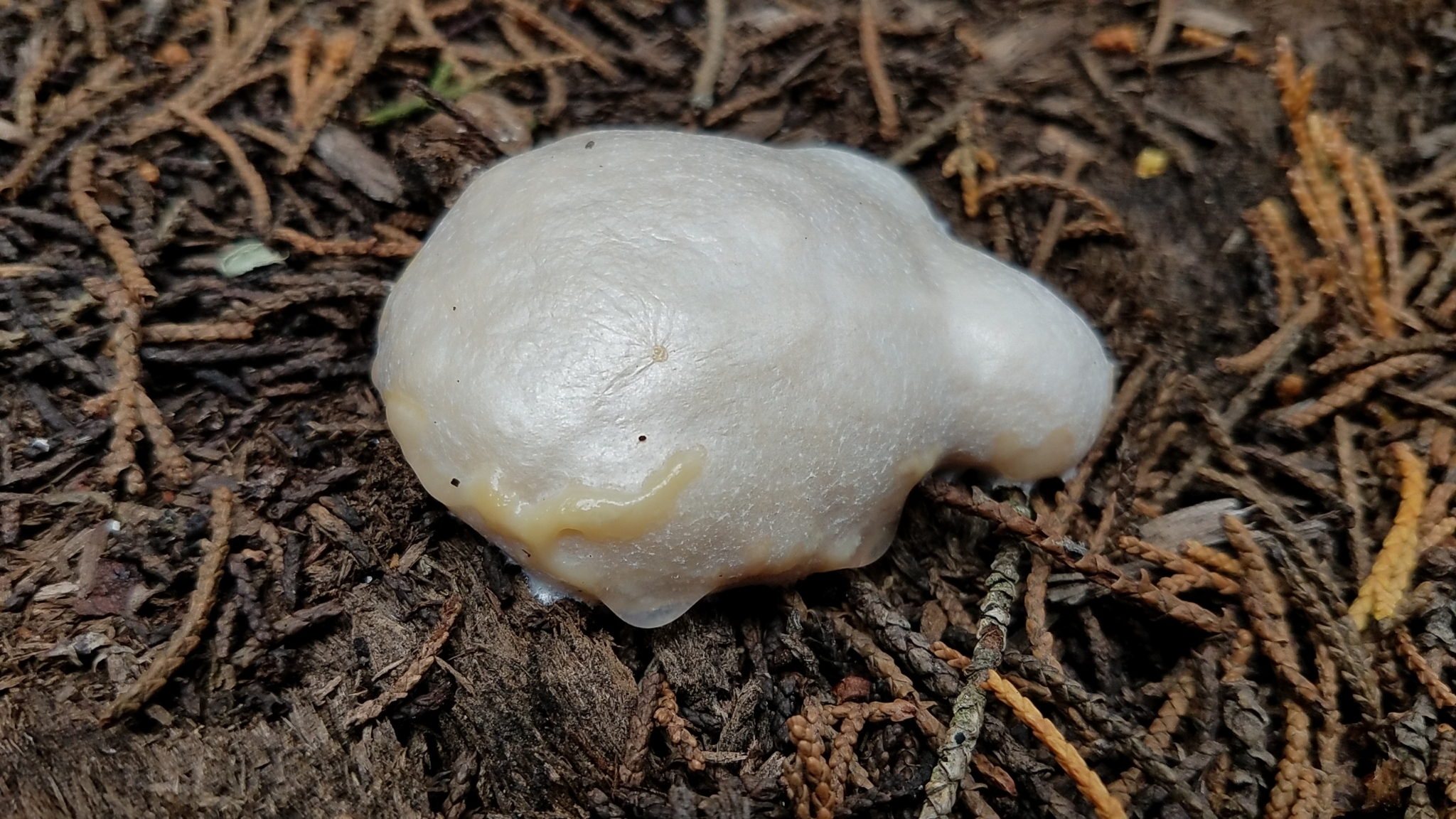
- Reticularia lycoperdon growing on cypress duff

Scientific classification
- Domain: Eukaryota
- Phylum: Amoebozoa
- Class: Myxogastria
- Order: Trichiales
- Family: Dianemataceae
- Genus: Enteridium
- Species: E. lycoperdon

Binomial name
- Enteridium lycoperdon (Bull.) M.L. Farr, 1976

Synonyms
- Fuligo lycoperdon (Bull.) Schumach; Lycogala punctata Pers. Lycogala turbinata Pers. Mucor lycogalus Bolton; Reticularia lycoperdon Bull. Reticularia umbrina Fr. Strongylium fuliginoides (Pers.) Ditmar

= Enteridium lycoperdon =

Species of slime mold

Reticularia lycoperdon, the false puffball, is one of the more conspicuous species of slime mould or Myxogastria, typically seen in its reproductive phase as a white 'swelling' on standing dead trees in the spring, or on large pieces of fallen wood. Alder (Alnus glutinosa) is a common host.

== Taxonomy ==
It was first described in 1791 by Jean Baptiste François Pierre Bulliard as Reticularia lycoperdon, but was assigned to the genus, Enteridium, by Marie L. Farr in 1976. The name Reticularia lycoperdon is accepted by the taxonomic databases: Ausfungi Index Fungorum, and IRMNG.

== Habitats and distribution ==
E. lycoperdon grows typically on dead alder branches, logs, and stumps in wet places beside rivers, streams and wetlands; it is also found growing on dead elm, beech, poplar, hawthorn, elder, hornbeam, damson, hazel, and pine trees often after late frosts in spring and in the autumn.

It is recorded throughout Scotland, England, Wales, Ireland, Europe, and in Mexico.

== Feeding ==
The plasmodial phase feeds by phagocytosis upon bacteria, fungi, moulds, yeasts, inorganic particles and spores. If conditions become too dry, the plasmodium changes into a sclerotium, a dry and dormant state, awaiting the return of wet conditions.

== Structure and appearance ==
=== Life cycle ===
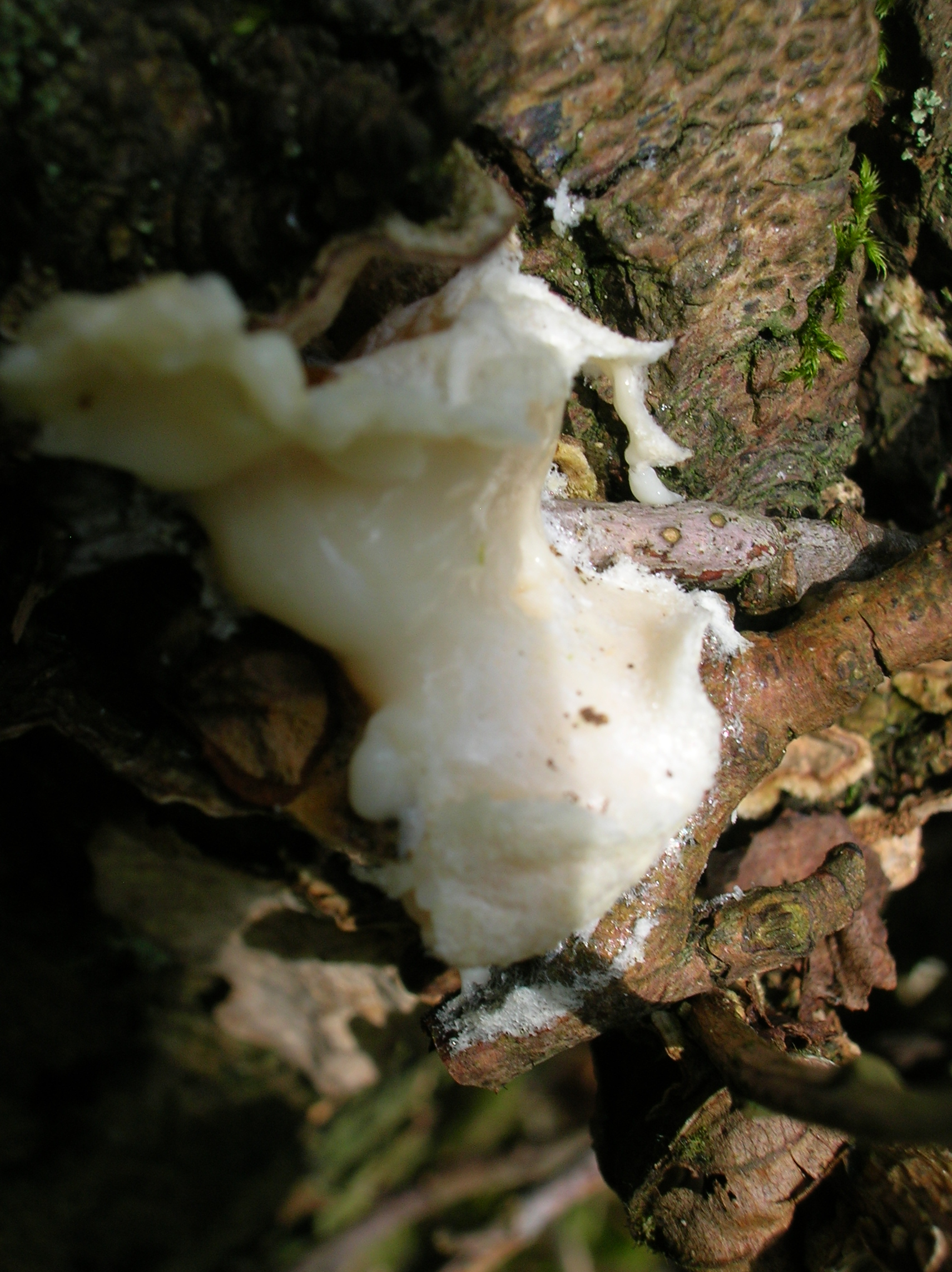
Sporangial phase with glutinous contents

The slime mould has two phases to its life cycle: an actively feeding plasmodial stage and a reproductive sporangial stage.

The plasmodial phase is mobile and is multi-nucleate, formed by the fusion of single cells and typically amoeboid in its movements, through cytoplasmic streaming.

The sporangial or aethalial phase of this slime mould is spherical, elongate or globular, 50 to 80 mm, and is at first highly glutinous in appearance, resembling small slug eggs. Later a smooth white and silvery surface develops, which eventually splits to expose a brown spore mass beneath. An aethalium is a term relating to slime moulds, referring to the relatively big, plump, pillow-shaped fruiting body, formed by the aggregation of plasmodia into a single functional body. The term comes from the Greek for thick smoke or soot; so named from the smokelike spores.

=== Spores ===
The spores are brown, subglobose or ovoid, punctate (spotted), 5–7 μm in size and dispersed by wind and rain until only a few delicate threads of the sporangium remain, resembling soft foam padding.

==== Insect associates ====
A slime mould fly, Epicypta testata, is known to lay its eggs within the spore mass and puparia can be seen with their tips protruding. The adult fly lays its eggs within the plasmodial phase, feeding upon it. The larval phase then hatches as worm-like larvae that pupate and then hatch, carrying and dispersing some of the spores which have stuck to them.

== Edibility ==
Though not generally considered edible, E. lycoperdon is not toxic. In Veracruz, Mexico, the very young aethalia are collected, fried, and eaten.

== Folklore ==
E. lycoperdon is named "caca de luna" or "Moon's excrement" by the locals in the state of Veracruz in Mexico.

== See also ==
- Lycogala epidendrum – Wolf's milk or Toothpaste slime
- Puffball
