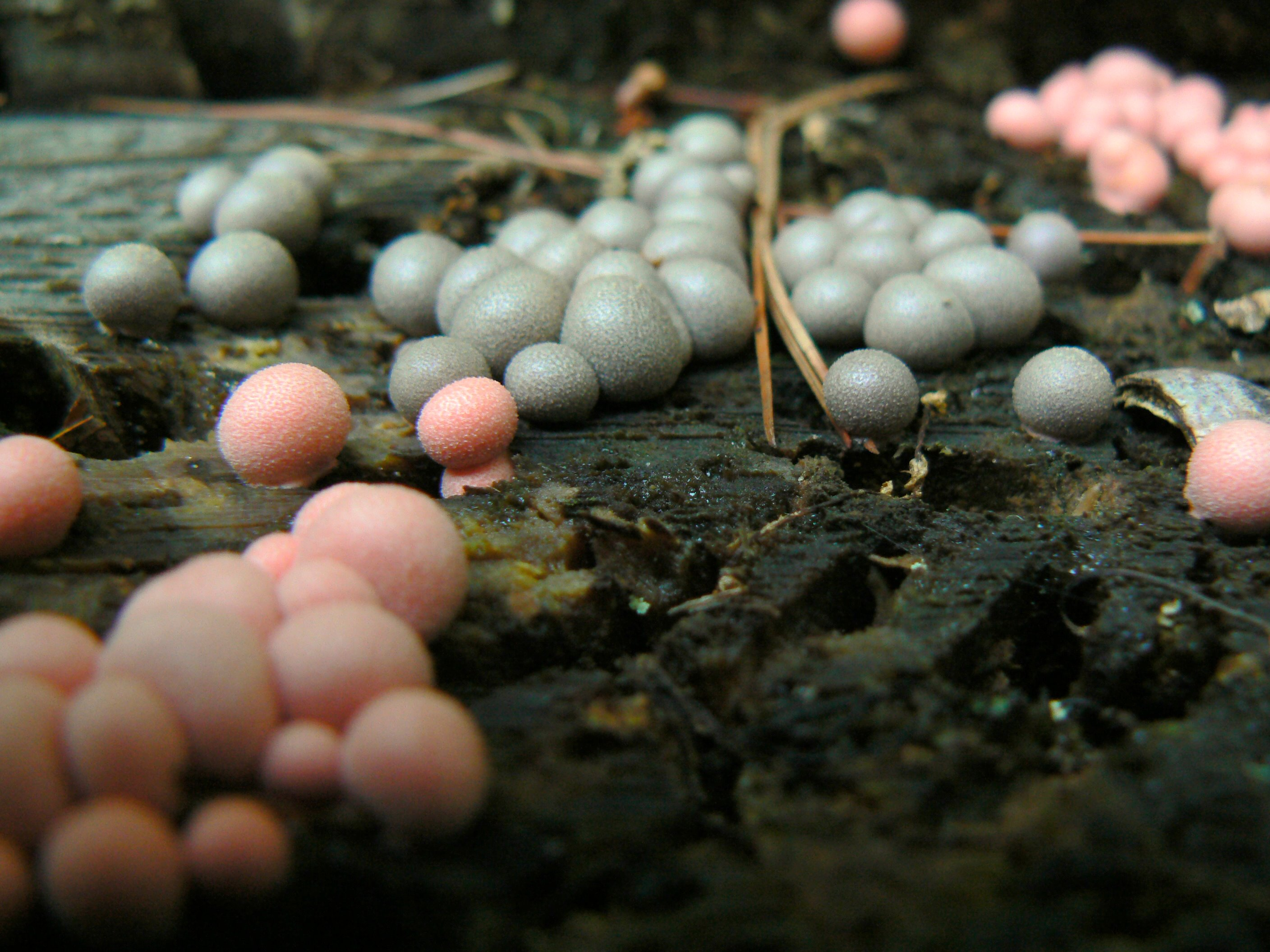
- Fruiting bodies of L. epidendrum

Scientific classification
- Domain: Eukaryota
- Supergroup: Amorphea
- Phylum: Amoebozoa
- Class: Myxogastria
- Order: Liceales
- Family: Tubiferaceae
- Genus: Lycogala
- Species: L. epidendrum

Binomial name
- Lycogala epidendrum Linnaeus & Fries, 1829

= Lycogala epidendrum =

Species of slime mould

Lycogala epidendrum, commonly known as wolf's milk or groening's slime, is a cosmopolitan species of myxogastrid amoeba which is often mistaken for a fungus. The aethalia, or fruiting bodies, occur either scattered or in groups on damp rotten wood, especially on large logs, from June to November. These aethalia are small, pink to brown cushion-like blobs. They may ooze a pink "paste" if the outer wall is broken before maturity. When mature, the colour tends to become more brownish. When not fruiting, single celled individuals move about as very small, red amoeba-like organisms called plasmodia, masses of protoplasm that engulf bacteria, as well as fungal and plant spores, protozoa, and particles of non-living organic matter through phagocytosis (see slime mould for more information).

== Description ==
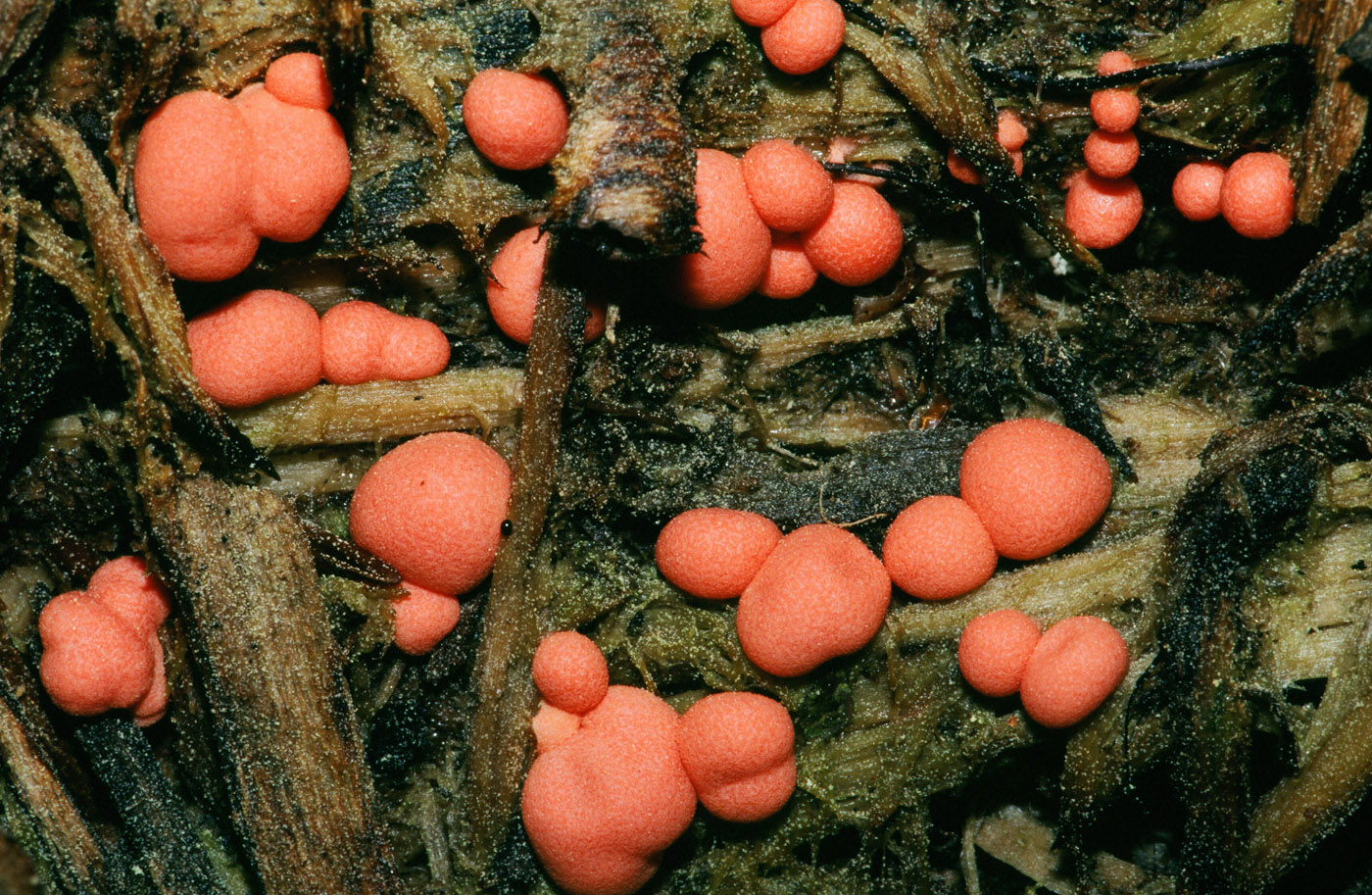
Aethalia on decaying wood

During the plasmodial stage, individuals are reddish in colour, but these are almost never seen. When conditions change, the individuals aggregate by means of chemical signalling to form an aethalium, or fruiting body. These appear as small cushion-like blobs measuring about 3–15 millimetres (0.12–0.59 in) in diameter. Colour is quite variable, ranging from pinkish grey to yellowish brown or greenish black, with mature individuals tending towards the darker end. They may be either round or somewhat compressed with a warted or rough texture. While immature they are filled with a pink, paste-like fluid. With maturity the fluid becomes a powdery mass of minute grey spores. The spores measure 6 to 7.5 μm and are round in shape with a netted texture and appearing ochre to lavender in colour. The pseudocapillitia, sterile elements in the spore mass, are long, flattened, branching tubes with transverse wrinkles and folds.

=== Similar species ===
Similar species include Hemitrichia calyculata, Physarum cinereum, Physarum nutans, and Trichia varia.

== Natural products found in this species ==
=== Staurosporine analogues ===
- Lycogarubin C (also known as chromopyrrolic acid)
- 6-hydroxystaurosporinone
- 5,6-dihydroxyarcyriaflavin A

=== Antimicrobal lactones ===
Chemically, these are polypropionate lactone glycosides.

Lycogalinoside A contains a 2-deoxy-alpha-L-fucopyranosyl-(1-4)-6-deoxy-beta-D-gulopyranosyl unit.

Lycogalinoside B contains a beta-D-olivopyranosyl-(1-4)-beta-D-fucopyranosyl unit.

== Taxonomy ==
This species is classified in the family Tubiferaceae, although it is accepted in the Reticulariaceae family by the Integrated Taxonomic Information System.

== See also ==
- Enteridium lycoperdon, the false puffball slime mould
