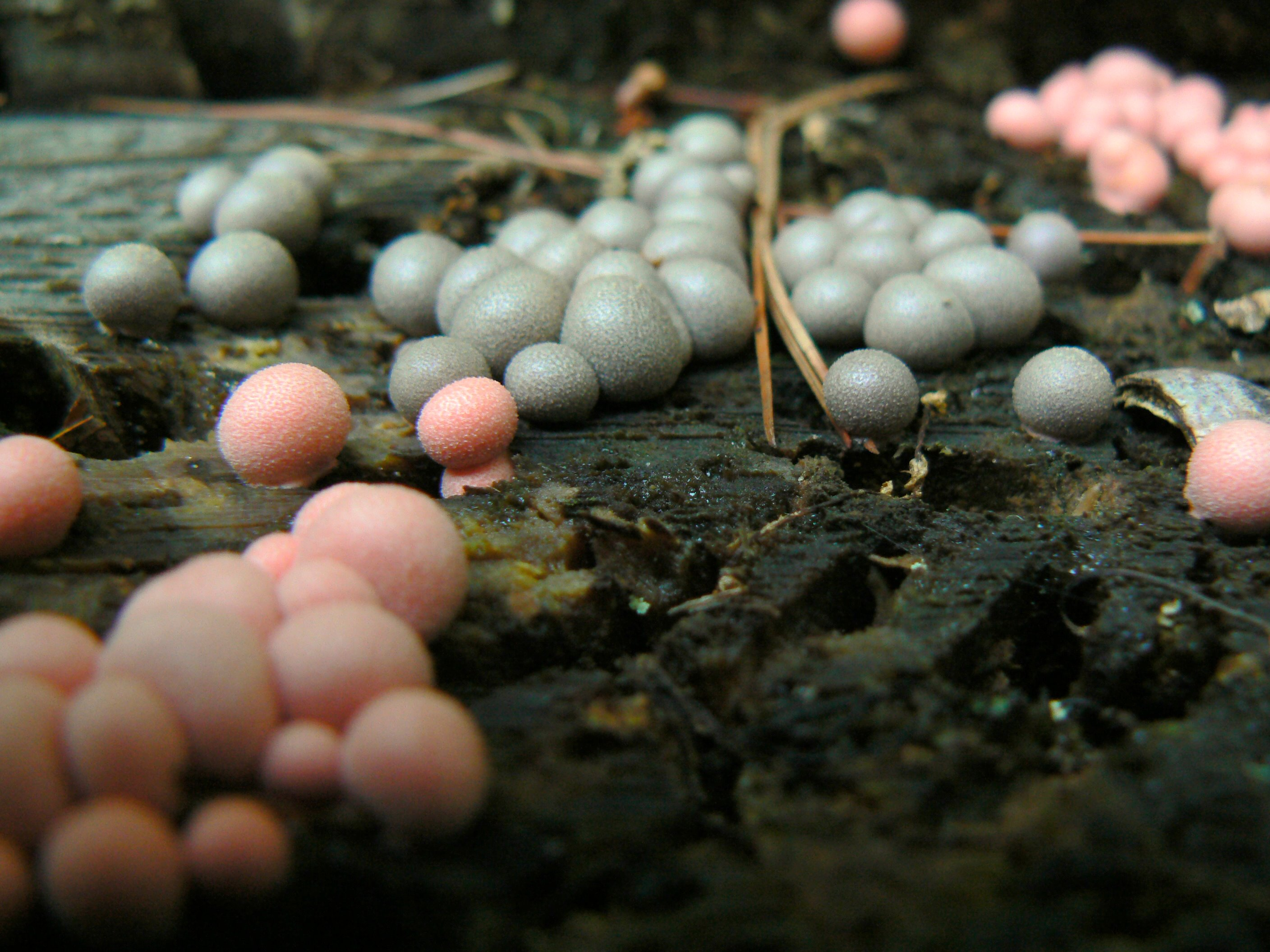
- Lycogala epidendrum

Scientific classification
- Domain: Eukaryota
- Clade: Amorphea
- Phylum: Amoebozoa
- Class: Myxogastria
- Order: Liceales

= Liceales =

Order of slime moulds

Liceales (ICN) or Liceida (ICZN) is an order of Amoebozoa.
