= List of slime moulds of South Africa =

This is an alphabetical list of the slime mould taxa recorded from South Africa.

== A ==
Genus: Aethalium Link 1809, accepted as Fuligo Haller, (1768)

- Aethalium septicum (L.) Fr. 1829 accepted as Fuligo septica (L.) F.H. Wigg., (1780)

Family: Arcyriaceae Rostaf. ex Cooke 1877 accepted as Trichiales T.Macbr. (1922)

Genus: Arcyria

- Arcyria cinerae Pers.
- Arcyria denudata Wettstein
- Arcyria incamata Pers.
- Arcyria insignis Kalchbr. & Cooke
- Arcyria nutans Grev.
- Arcyria oerstedtii Rost.
- Arcyria pomiformis Rost.
- Arcyria punicea Pers.
- Arcyria serpula Mass.

== B ==
Genus: Badhamia

- Badhamia affinis Rost.
- Badhamia foliicola Lister.
- Badhamia macrocarpa Rost.
- Badhamia nitens Berk.
- Badhamia rubiginosa var. dictyospora Lister
- Badhamia utricularis Berk.
- Badhamia varia Mass.
- Badhamia sp.

== C ==
Family: Ceratiomyxaceae see Ceratiomyxidae

Genus: Ceratiomyxa J. Schrot. (1889), (slime moulds)

- Ceratiomyxa fruticulosa Macbr.
- Ceratiomyxa fruticulosa var. flexuosa Lister
- Ceratiomyxa fruticulosa var. porioides Lister

== D ==
Genus: Dictydiaethalium

- Dictydiaethalium plumbeum Rost.

Genus: Dictydium

- Dictydium cancellatum Macbr.

Family: Didymiaceae

Genus: Didymium

- Didymium difforme Duby.
- Didymium leucopus Fr.
- Didymium melanospermum Macbr.
- Didymium microcarpon Rost.
- Didymium nigripes Fr.
- Didymium nigripes var. eximium Lister.
- Didymium nigripes var. xanthopus Lister.
- Didymium physaroides Fr.
- Didymium squamulosum Fr.

== E ==
Genus: Enerthenema Bowman 1830

- Enerthenema papillatum (Pers.) Rostaf. 1876

== F ==
Genus: Fuligo Haller 1768 (Slime moulds)

- Fuligo cinerea (Schwein.) Morgan 1896
- Fuligo muscorum Alb. & Schwein. 1805
- Fuligo septica Gmel.(sic) possibly (L.) F.H. Wigg. 1780
- Fuligo varians Sommerf. 1826,

== H ==
Genus: Hemitrichia

- Hemitrichia clavata Rost.
- Hemitrichia serpula Rost.
- Hemitrichia vesparium Macbr.

== L ==
Genus: Lamproderma

- Lamproderma scintillans Morg.
- Lamproderma violaceum Rost.

Genus: Leocarpus

- Leocarpus fragilis Rost.

== M ==
Genus: Mucilago

- Mucilago spongiosa Morg.

Myxomycetes (Slime moulds)

== P ==
Family: Physaraceae

Genus: Physarum

- Physarum auriscalpium Cooke.
- Physarum bitectum Lister.
- Physarum bogoriense Rac.
- Physarum capense Rost.
- Physarum cinereum Pers.
- Physarum citrinum Schum.
- Physarum columbinum Sturgis.
- Physarum compactum Lister
- Physarum compressum Alb. & Schw.
- Physarum confertum Macbr.
- Physarum didermoides Rost.
- Physarum digitatum Farquh. & G. Lister.
- Physarum flavicomum Berk.
- Physarum gyrosum Rost.
- Physarum javanicum Rac.
- Physarum kalchbrenneri Mass.
- Physarum leucophaeum Fr.
- Physarum leucopus Link.
- Physarum melleum Mass.
- Physarum mutabile Lister.
- Physarum nucleatum Rex.
- Physarum nutans Pers.
- Physarum nutans var. leucophaeum Lister.
- Physarum penetrale Rex.
- Physarum pusillum Lister.
- Physarum roseum Berk. & Br.
- Physarum sinuosum Weinm.
- Physarum tenerum Rex.
- Physarum vemum Sommerf.
- Physarum viride Pers.
- Physarum viride var. aurantiaeum Lister.
- Physarum viride var. incanum Lister.

== R ==
Genus: Reticularia

- Reticularia lycoperdon Bull.

Family: Reticulariaceae

== S ==
Family: Stemonitaceae

Genus: Stemonitis

- Stemonitis acuminata Mass.
- Stemonitis ferruginea Ehrenb.
- Stemonitis friesiana de Bary.
- Stemonitis fusca Roth.
- Stemonitis herbatica Peck.
- Stemonitis maxima Mass.
- Stemonitis pallida Wingate.
- Stemonitis splendens Rost.
- Stemonitis splendens var. webberi Lister.

== T ==
Genus: Trichia

- Trichia affinis de Bary
- Trichia balfourii Mass.
- Trichia botrytis Pers.
- Trichia faboginea Pers.
- Trichia fragilis Rost.
- Trichia persimilis Karst.
- Trichia scabra Rost.
- Trichia turbinata Sow.
- Trichia varia Pers.

Family: Trichiaceae

Genus: Tubifera (Slime moulds)

- Tubifera ferruginosa Gmel.
