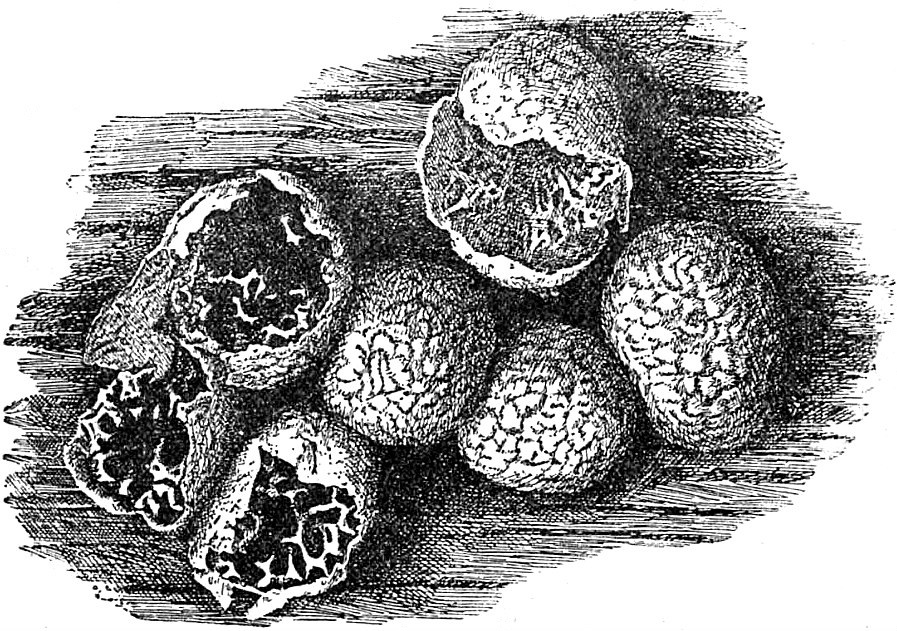
- The slime mold Badhamia panicea

Scientific classification
- Domain: Eukaryota
- Clade: Amorphea
- Phylum: Amoebozoa
- Class: Myxogastria
- Order: Physarales
- Family: Physaraceae
- Genus: Badhamia
- Species: B. panicea

Binomial name
- Badhamia panicea (Fr.) Rostaf.

Synonyms
- Physarum paniceum Fr.

= Badhamia panicea =

Species of slime mould

Badhamia panicea is a species of slime mold in the family Physaraceae. It was first scientifically described in 1873.

== Description ==
They look like a series of white round growths that are found in clusters on wood chips. As they mature the colour changes to dark grey before going to a light grey form. They have black spores and sit on thin red stems.

== Habitat ==
They are found in humid areas like reptile tanks, especially if they contain wood chippings. In nature, they are common on fallen tree trunks, especially beech.
