= Audrey Dussutour =

French ethologist (born 1977)

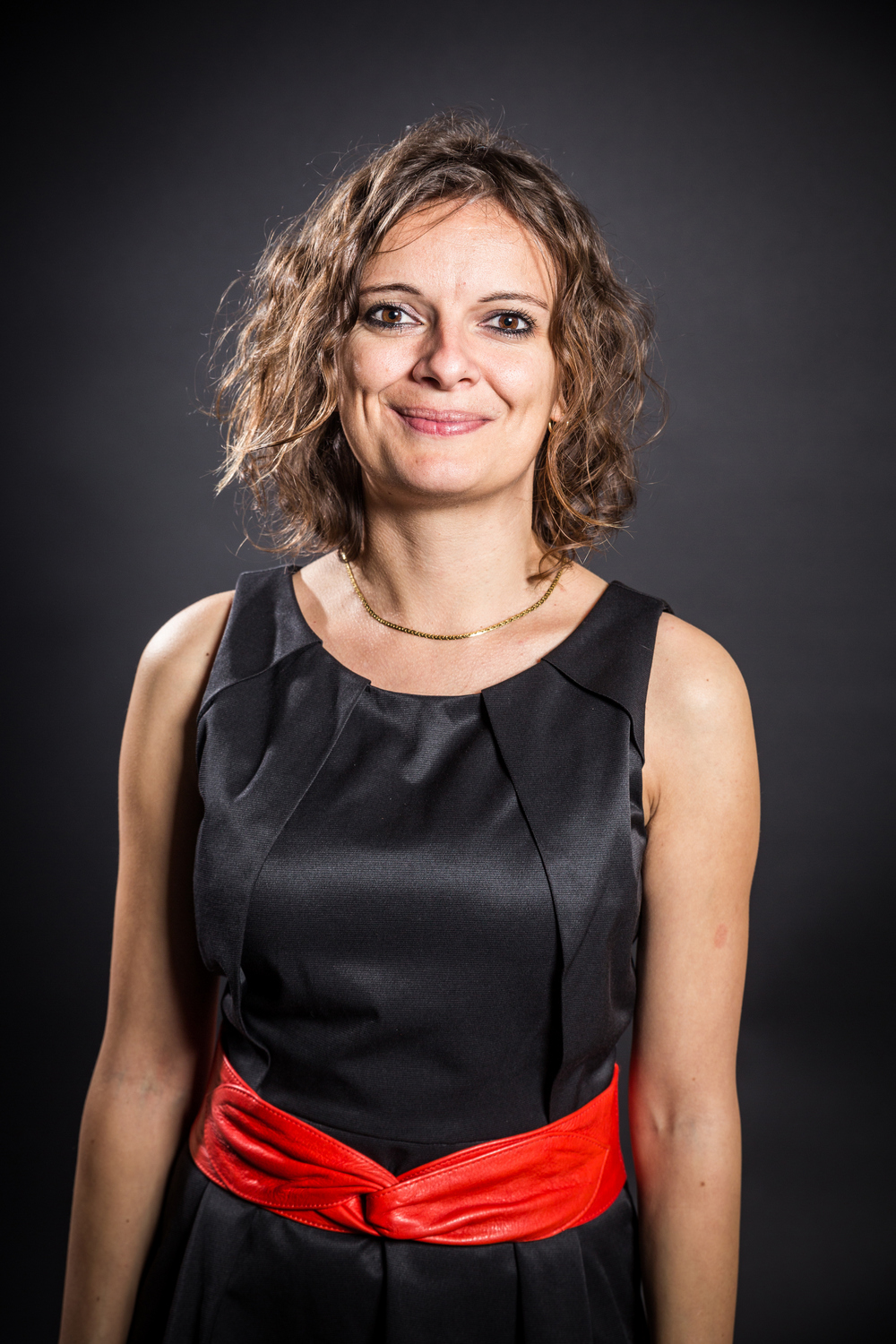
- Audrey Dussutour in 2013
- Born: 31 December 1977 (age 48); Rodez, France
- Occupation: Ethologist

Academic background
- Education: University of Toulouse
- Thesis: Organisation spatio-temporelle des déplacements collectifs chez les fourmis (2004)

Audrey Dussutour (born 31 December 1977) is a French ethologist, specialist in ants and single-celled organisms, who is a director of research at the French National Centre for Scientific Research (CNRS).

== Biography ==
Audrey Dussutour was born on 31 December 1977 in Rodez in Aveyron, France.

Her studies led her to a doctorate in ethology at Paul Sabatier University in Toulouse, with a thesis entitled "Spatio-temporal organization of collective movement in ants". Following post-doctoral fellowships at Concordia University (Canada) and the University of Sydney (Australia), she was recruited to the CNRS in 2009, first as a researcher and then as research director.

She is a specialist in ants and single-celled organisms, such as physarum polycephalum, a slime mould commonly known as "blob".

Dussutour is also part of the editorial board of several scientific journals: Scientific Reports, Journal of Animal Ecology and Swarm Intelligence (Springer Nature).

== Work ==
Dussutour is the author of several scientific publications, presenting her research on ants or myxomycetes and published in various international journals, including those of the Royal Society.

From October 2021, she participated in Élève Ton Blob, an educational experiment consisting of sending a "blob" of Physarum polycephalum to the International Space Station and inviting schools to conduct the same experiment as that conducted in weightlessness. Initially planned for 2,000 classes in France, this experience finally brought together 4,500 French schools.

== Publications ==
- Tout ce que vous avez toujours voulu savoir sur le blob sans jamais oser le demander ("Everything you always wanted to know about the blob but never dared to ask", Éditions des Équateurs, Paris, 2017 (ISBN 978-2-84990-498-5)
- L'Odyssée des fourmis ("The odyssey of ants"), with Antoine Wystrach, Éditions Grasset, Paris, 2022 (ISBN 978-2-246-81719-2)
- Moi le blob ("I the blob"), Éditions HumenSciences, 2022, (ISBN 978-2379315589
- Les champignons de l'apocalypse ("The mushrooms of the apocalypse"), Grasset, 2025 (ISBN 978-2-246-83564-6)

== Awards ==
- Knight of the National Order of Merit (2021)
