= Cupularia =

Cupularia may refer to:

- Cupularia, a disused synonym for Craterium, a genus of slime molds
- Cupularia, a disused synonym for Inula, a genus of plants
