= Bis(5'-nucleosyl)-tetraphosphatase (symmetrical) =

Class of enzymes

Identifiers
- EC no.: 3.6.1.41
- CAS no.: 85638-48-8

Databases
- BRENDA: enzyme data
- ExPASy: NiceZyme view
- KEGG: enzyme entry
- MetaCyc: metabolic pathway
- Rhea: reactions
- PDB structures: RCSB PDB PDBe PDBsum
- Gene Ontology: AmiGO / QuickGO
Search
- PMC: articles
- PubMed: articles
- NCBI: proteins

Bis(5'-nucleosyl)-tetraphosphatase (symmetrical) (EC 3.6.1.41) is an enzyme characterised from Physarum polycephalum and Escherichia coli that catalyzes the hydrolysis of adenosine and guanosine polyphosphates: For example, P(1),P(4)-bis(5'-guanosyl) tetraphosphate is converted to two molecules of guanosine diphosphate:

P(1),P(4)-bis(5'-guanosyl) tetraphosphate
H_{2}O
2
guanosine diphosphate

The enzyme is part of the extracellular purinergic signalling process.

This enzyme is a hydrolase, specifically one acting on acid anhydrides in phosphorus-containing anhydrides. The systematic name of this enzyme class is P1,P4-bis(5'-nucleosyl)-tetraphosphate nucleosidebisphosphohydrolase. Other names in use include diadenosinetetraphosphatase (symmetrical), dinucleosidetetraphosphatasee (symmetrical), symmetrical diadenosine tetraphosphate hydrolase, adenosine tetraphosphate phosphodiesterase, Ap4A hydrolase, bis(5'-adenosyl) tetraphosphatase, diadenosine tetraphosphate hydrolase, diadenosine polyphosphate hydrolase, diadenosine 5',5-P1,P4-tetraphosphatase, diadenosinetetraphosphatase (symmetrical), 1-P,4-P-bis(5'-nucleosyl)-tetraphosphate, and nucleosidebisphosphohydrolase.

== Structural studies ==
As of late 2007, two structures have been solved for this class of enzymes, with PDB accession codes PDB: 2DFJ and PDB: 2QJC.

== See also ==
- Bis(5'-nucleosyl)-tetraphosphatase (asymmetrical), which catalyses similar reactions leading to a monophosphate and a triphosphate
