= Johann Heinrich Friedrich Link =

German naturalist and botanist (1767–1851)

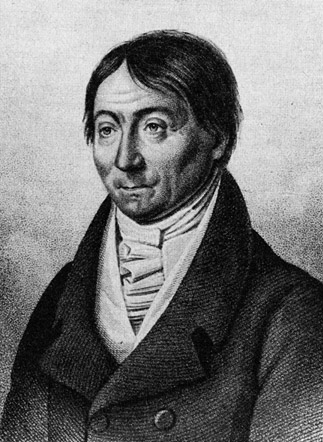
- Born: 2 February 1767; Hildesheim, Holy Roman Empire
- Died: 1 January 1851 (aged 83); Berlin, German Confederation
- Spouse: Charlotte Juliane Josephi
- Scientific career
- Author abbrev. (botany): Link

Johann Heinrich Friedrich Link (2 February 1767 – 1 January 1851) was a German naturalist and botanist. The standard author abbreviation Link is used to indicate this person as the author when citing a botanical name.

== Biography ==
Link was born at Hildesheim as a son of the minister August Heinrich Link (1738–1783), who taught him love of nature through collection of 'natural objects'. He studied medicine and natural sciences at the Hannoverschen Landesuniversität of Göttingen, and graduated as MD in 1789, promoting on his thesis "Flora der Felsgesteine rund um Göttingen" (Flora of the rocky beds around Göttingen). One of his teachers was the famous natural scientist Johann Friedrich Blumenbach (1752–1840). He became a private tutor (Privatdozent) in Göttingen.

In 1792, he became the first professor of the new department of chemistry, zoology and botany at the University of Rostock. During his stay at Rostock, he became an early follower of the antiphlogistic theory of Lavoisier, teaching about the existence of oxygen instead of phlogiston. He was also a proponent of the attempts of Jeremias Benjamin Richter to involve mathematics in chemistry, introducing stoichiometry in his chemistry lessons. In 1806, he set up the first chemical laboratory at Rostock in the "Seminargebäude". He began to write an abundant number of articles and books on the most different subjects, such as physics and chemistry, geology and mineralogy, botany, zoology, natural philosophy and ethics, prehistoric and early history. He was twice elected rector of the university.

In 1793, he married Charlotte Juliane Josephi (1768?–1829), sister of his colleague at the university Prof. Wilhelm Josephi (1763–1845).

During 1797–1799, he visited Portugal with Count Johann Centurius Hoffmannsegg, a botanist, entomologist and ornithologist from Dresden. This trip made him finally choose botany as his main scientific calling.

In 1800, he was elected to the prestigious Leopoldina Academy, the oldest school for natural history in Europe.

In 1808, he was awarded a prize at the Academy of Saint Petersburg for his monography Von der Natur und den Eigenschaften des Lichts (nature and characteristics of light).

His scientific reputation grew and became widely known. In 1811, he was appointed professor of chemistry and botany at Breslau university, where he was equally elected twice rector of the university.

After the death of Carl Ludwig Willdenow in 1815, he became professor of natural history, curator of the herbarium and director of the botanic garden (Hortus regius Berolinensis) in Berlin until he died. This period became the most fruitful period of his academic life. He augmented the collection of the garden to 14,000 specimens, many of them rare plants. He worked in close collaboration with Cristoph Friedrich Otto (1783–1856), conservator at the botanical garden. In 1827, he named with him the cacti genera Echinocactus and Melocactus. Most of the fungi that he named, are still recognised under the original name, proving the high quality of his work (such as Cordyceps, Creopus, Fusarium, Leocarpus, Myxomycetes, Penicillium, Phragmidium).

He was elected member of the Berlin Academy of Science and many other scientific societies, including the Royal Swedish Academy of Sciences, which elected him a foreign member in 1840.

He trained a whole new generation of natural scientists, such as Christian Gottfried Ehrenberg (1795–1876). Throughout his life, he travelled extensively throughout Europe. He benefited from his knowledge of foreign languages, including Arabic and ancient Sanskrit.

He died in Berlin on 1 January 1851, a month before his 84th birthday. He was succeeded by Alexander Heinrich Braun (1805–1877).

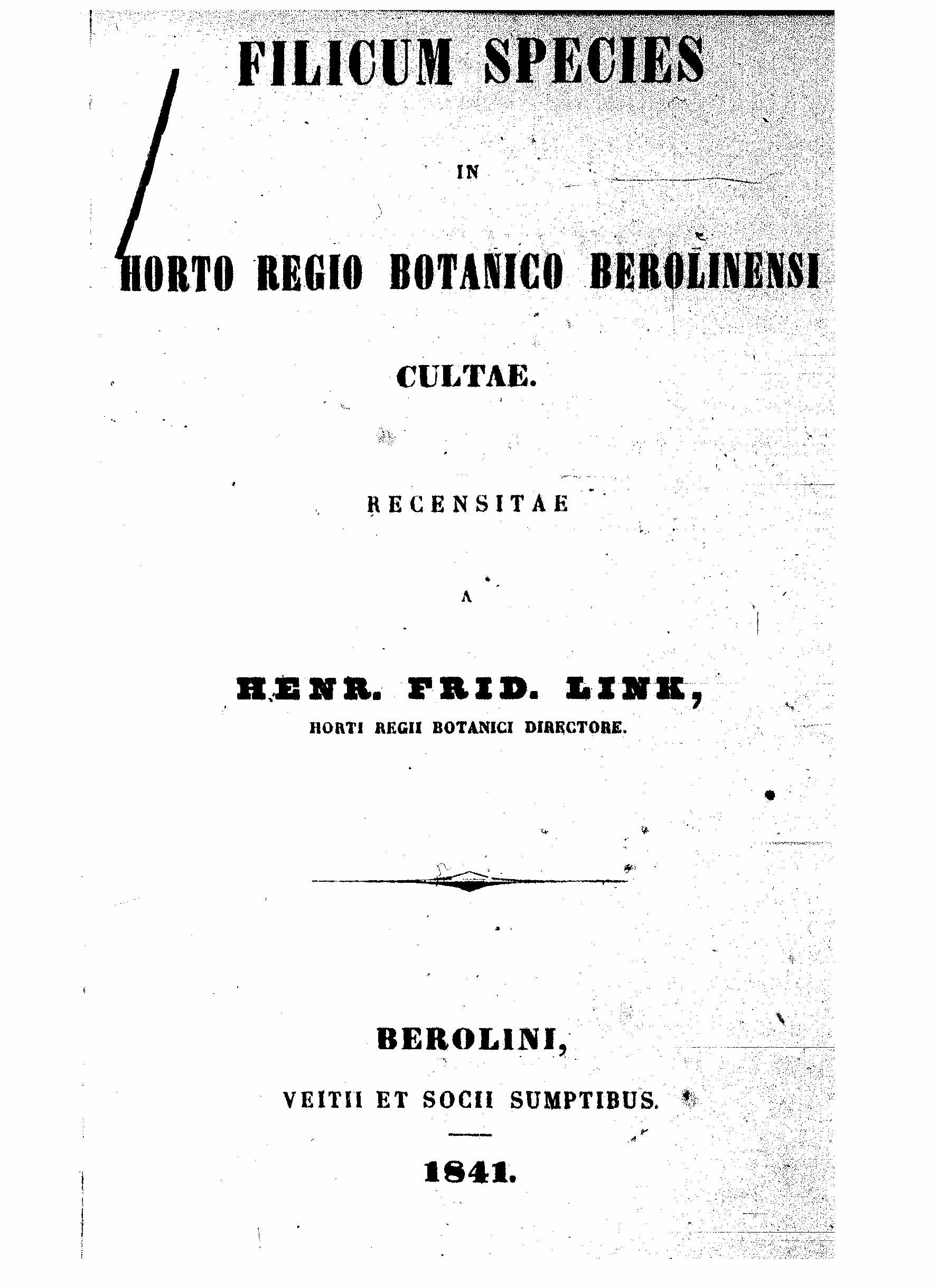
Title page of Filicum species in horto regio Berolinensi cultae

He is recognised as one of the last scientists of the 19th century with a universal knowledge. Link was also one of the few German botanists of his time, who aimed at a complete understanding of plants, through a systematic anatomical and physiological research.

His most important work is the Handbuch zur Erkennung der nutzbarsten und am häufigsten vorkommenden Gewächse (three volumes, published between 1829 and 1833).

== Selected works ==
- Link, Johann Heinrich Friedrich (1799). "Nachricht von einer Reise nach Portugal nebst botanischen Bemerkungen. In einem Schreiben an den Herausgeber von dem Hrn. Prof. Link". Journal für die Botanik (Schrader). 2: 297–326.
- Grundlehren der Anatomie und Physiologie der Pflanzen (Göttingen. 1807); (Fundamental principles of the anatomy and physiology of plants) (proving for the first time that plant cells existed independently and were not part of a homogeneous vegetable mass).
- Nachträge zu den Grundlehren etc. (Göttingen. 1809) (Supplement to the fundamental principles etc. )
- Die Urwelt und das Altertum, erläutert durch die Naturkunde (Berlin 1820–1822, 2nd ed. 1834); (Prehistoric times and antiquity, explained by natural history)
- Link, Johann Heinrich Friedrich (1829). Handbuch zur Erkennung der nutzbarsten und am häufigsten vorkommenden Gewächse (in German). Berlin: Haude und Spener. Digital edition by the University and State Library Düsseldorf
  - Erster Theil (1829).
  - Zweiter Theil (1831).
  - Dritter Theil (1833).
- Das Altertum und der Übergang zur neuern Zeit (Berlin 1842); (Antiquity and the transition to modern times)
- Elementa philosophiae botanicae (Berlin 1824; 2nd ed., in Latin and German 1837);
- Anatomisch-botanische Abbildungen zur Erläuterung der Grundlehren der Kräuterkunde (Berlin 1837–42); (Anatomical-botanical illustrations explaining the basic teachings for herbalists)
- Ausgewählte anatomisch-botanische Abbildungen (Berlin 1839–42) (Selected anatomical botanical illustrations) (
- Filicum species in horto regio Berolinensi cultae (Berlin 1841) (Fern species in Berlin botanical garden)
- Anatomie der Pflanzen in Abbildungen (Berlin. 1843–47). (Illustrated anatomy of plants)
- He published together with Friedrich Otto :
  - Icones plantarum selectarum horti regii botanici Berolinensis (Berlin 1820–28) (Illustrations of selected plants in Berlin botanic garden)
- He published with Christoph Friedrich Otto (this work was finished by the Friedrich Klotzsch, 1841–1844, curator at the Botanical Museum)
    - Icones plantarum rariorum horti regii botanici Berolinensis (Berlin 1828–31) (Illustrations of rare plants in the Berlin botanic garden)
- He published together with count von Hoffmansegg
  - Flore portugaise" (Berlin. 1809–1840) (Portuguese Flora) (remaining a standard work for a long time)
