= Jean-Jacques d'Ortous de Mairan =

18th-century French geophysicist, astronomer, and chronobiologist

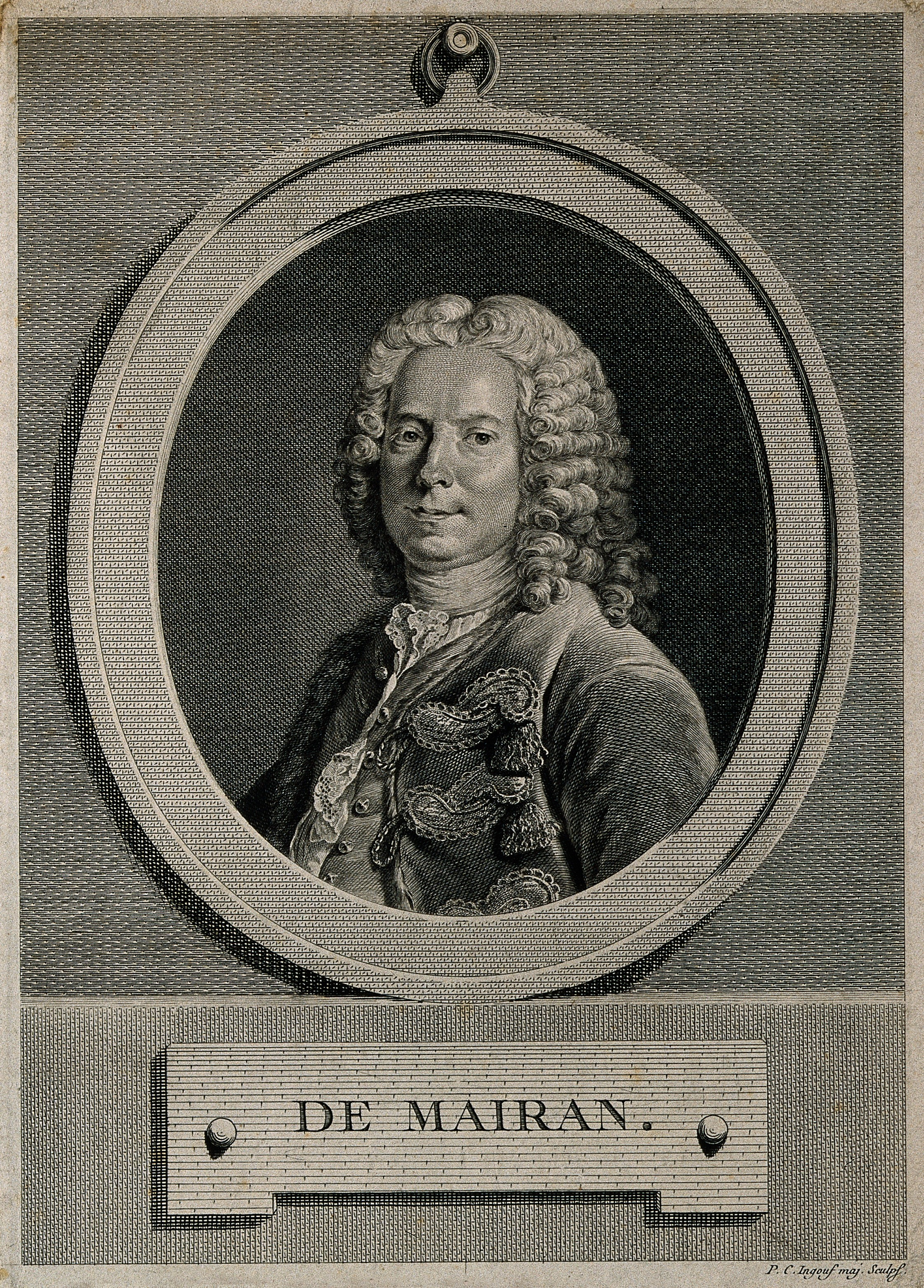
- Engraving by Pierre-Charles Ingouf (1746–1800)
- Born: 26 November 1678; Béziers, France
- Died: 20 February 1771 (aged 92); Paris, France
- Education: University of Toulouse
- Known for: Studies of circadian rhythm
- Awards: Elected to the French Academy of Sciences, Fellow of the Royal Society, Foreign Member of the Royal Swedish Academy of Sciences
- Scientific career
- Fields: Geophysics, astronomy, chronobiology
- Patrons: Cardinal de Fleury, Louis XV, Prince of Conti, Duke of Orléans
- Doctoral advisor: Nicolas Malebranche

Jean-Jacques d'Ortous de Mairan (26 November 1678 – 20 February 1771) was a French natural philosopher (physicist), born in the town of Béziers on 26 November 1678. De Mairan lost his father, François d'Ortous, at age four and his mother twelve years later at age sixteen. Over the course of his life, de Mairan was elected into numerous scientific societies and made key discoveries in a variety of fields, including ancient texts and astronomy. His observations and experiments also inspired the beginning of what is now known as the study of biological circadian rhythms. At the age of 92, de Mairan died of pneumonia in Paris on 20 February 1771.

== Biography ==
De Mairan attended college in Toulouse from 1694–1697 with a focus on ancient Greek. In 1698, he went to Paris to study mathematics and physics under the teachings of Nicolas Malebranche. In 1702, he returned home to Béziers and began his lifelong study of several fields, most notably astronomy and plant rhythms. Furthermore, during his time in Béziers, he ate almost every day with the Bishop, Louis-Charles des Alrics du Rousset. In 1723, de Mairan, who had become a member of the Académie Royale des Sciences, co-founded the Académie de Béziers under the protection of Cardinal de Fleury, acting prime minister of Louis XV (and himself a protégé of a former Bishop of Béziers, Pierre de Bonsi). Eventually, de Mairan received official lodging in the Louvre where he remained pensionnaire until 1743 and served as secretary from 1741 to 1743. In 1746, he was reinstated as pensionnaire géomètre, or full-time boarding surveyor. It is reported that the Prince of Conti and other great lords heaped extravagant gifts upon him. He was also secretary to the Duke of Orléans.

=== Observations and notable experiments ===
- In 1719, De Mairan discussed the varying obliquity of light that causes cold in winter and heat in summer. He postulated that the Sun's heating effect was related to the square of the sine of its elevation. He neglected the effects of the atmosphere, admitting that he did not know how much the sun's heat would be absorbed by it. Two and a half years later, he presented a paper to the Academie Royale des Sciences in Paris: "Problem: the ratio of two degrees or quantities of sunlight seen through the atmosphere at two different known angular elevations being given, to find what part of the absolute light of the Sun is intercepted by the atmosphere at any desired elevation." In this paper, de Mairan made a hypothesis based on mere observations, supposing that the ratio had been measured, even though it had not. The significance of de Mairan's work, although incorrect, led his protégé, Pierre Bouguer, to invent the photometer.
- In 1729, de Mairan constructed an experiment showing the existence of a circadian rhythm in plants, presumably originating from an endogenous clock (See 'Experiment on circadian rhythms in plants' below).
- In 1731, he also observed a nebulosity around a star near the Orion Nebula. This was later designated M43 by Charles Messier.
- In 1731, he published "Traite Physique et Historique De l'Aurore Boreale" (a summary appeared in the Philosophical Transactions) in which he put up a novel hypothesis that the Northern Lights are caused by the Sun, as the interaction of the atmosphere with the zodiacal light. At the time, the aurorae were thought to be 'flames' caused by sulfurous effluvia emanating from the Earth.

== Experiment on circadian rhythms in plants ==
In 1729, de Mairan performed an experiment that demonstrated the existence of circadian rhythms in plants, specifically the travel wave. He was intrigued by the daily opening and closing of the heliotrope plant and performed a simple experiment where he exposed the plants to constant darkness and recorded the behaviour. De Mairan's key conclusion was that the daily rhythmic opening and closing of the leaves persisted even in the absence of sunlight. However, de Mairan did not infer that heliotropes have internal clocks driving leaf rhythms, but rather that they were able "to sense the Sun without ever seeing it". The concept of an internal clock was actually not formulated until much later, although de Mairan did suggest that "it would be curious to test [...] whether, using kilns heated to higher or lower temperatures, one could artificially recreate a day & night perceptible to [plants]; and whether in doing so one could reverse the order of the phenomena of true day & true night."

These results may have gone unnoticed had his colleague, Jean Marchant, not published them for de Mairan. It was quite common at the time, when travel was slow, for one scientist to present the work of another.

When describing his work with eclosion rhythms in his Drosophila models or the rhythmic running activity of mice, the founder of modern chronobiology, Colin Pittendrigh, recognised the work of Jean-Jacques d'Ortous de Mairan.

A video showing circadian rhythms in a cucumber plant in constant conditions, similar to what de Mairan observed, can be seen here on YouTube.

=== De Mairan's experimental legacy ===
Despite Marchant's publication of de Mairan's work, which might have suggested the existence of endogenous biological clocks, rhythms in plant movements were for a long time thought to be extrinsically controlled by light and dark cycles, or magnetic and temperature oscillations, or even a mysterious, yet-to-be identified X-factor.

In 1823, almost a century after de Mairan's work, the Swiss botanist Augustin Pyramus de Candolle expanded on it by measuring the free-running period of Mimosa pudica leaf movements in constant conditions, finding them to be 22–23 hours long. This was probably the first hint of what is now called the circadian (from Latin circa, about, and dies) nature of such endogenous rhythms, found in practically all living organisms, including some bacteria.

== Scientific societies and recognition ==
In 1718, de Mairan was inducted into the Académie Royale des Sciences. The Cardinal de Fleury and the Count of Maurepas selected Mairan to replace Bernard le Bovier de Fontenelle as "Secrétaire perpétuel" of the Académie in 1740, a position he accepted only for 3 years, and thus duly resigned in 1743. De Mairan also served as the Académie's assistant director and later director intermittently between 1721 and 1760. Eventually, de Mairan was appointed editor of the Journal des sçavans, a science periodical, by Chancellor d'Aguesseau. Also, in 1735, de Mairan was elected a Fellow of the Royal Society and in 1769, a Foreign Member of the Royal Swedish Academy of Sciences , as well as to the Russian Academy (St. Petersburg) in 1718. De Mairan was also a member of the Royal Societies of London, Edinburgh, and Uppsala; the Institute of Bologna, and the Academy of Rouen. With Jean Bouillet and Antoine Portalon, he founded his own scientific society in his hometown of Béziers, named the Académie de Béziers, around 1723.

== Selected publications ==
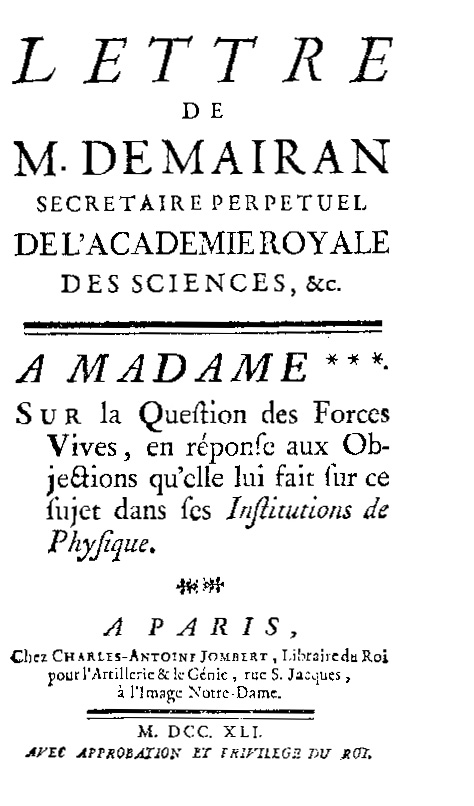
Sur la question des forces vives, 1741

Beyond astronomical and circadian observations, de Mairan actively worked in several other fields of physics, including "heat, light, sound, motion, the shape of the Earth, and the aurora".

The following is an abbreviated list of publications (with their English translations) organised by Dr. Robert A. Hatch at the University of Florida:

- Dissertation sur les variations du barometre (Bordeaux, 1715) (Essays on barometric variations)
- Dissertation sur la glace (Bordeaux 1716) (Essay on the ice)
- Dissertation sur la cause de la lumiere des phosphores et des noctiluques (Bordeaux, 1717) (Dissertation on the cause of light phosphates and noctilucence or nightly light)
- Dissertation sur l'estimation et la mesure des forces motrices des corps1728)Essay on the estimation of the measures of acting forces on the body
- Lettre de M. de Mairan à Madame. Sur la question des forces vives (1741) (Letter to Mme Chatelet on the Question of Living Forces), one side of a public debate with Émilie du Châtelet on forces vives.

He also published mathematical works.

- Traité physique et historique de l'aurore boréale, (1733) (Physical and historical Traits of the aurora borealis)
