= Non-neural cognition =

Cognition by non-neuronal cells

Non-neural cognition is the process by which cells other than neurons engage in information processing and rudimentary cognition. Non-neural cognition can manifest as cell memory, neurotransmitter signaling, or bioelectric communication and organization, and it is present in many organisms, from single-celled to humans.

== Cognition in slime molds ==
Evidence for cognition occurring outside of the brain can be seen in slime molds. For example, if Physarum polycephalum is placed in a maze that contains a reward at the end, it will grow in such a way that it will reach the reward, creating a continuous connection between the beginning and ending of the maze. The mold was able to compute the most optimal path, engage in coordinated movement, and redirect resources for cellular growth in the direction of a desired reward.

== Bioelectrical pattern recognition ==
Bioelectrical pattern recognition is one form of non-neural cognition. Planarians are able to regenerate severed bodies – when cut just behind the head, a new body will grow from the severed head, and a new head will grow from the body segment, resulting in two separate flatworms. The flatworm cells are able to determine the specific components of the regeneration through a change in bioelectrical signaling. There are high levels of bioelectrical activity closest to the head while the lowest levels occur at the furthest point from the head. If the voltage-gradient is disturbed upon severing the head from the body by increasing the voltage of both ends of the Planarian, the resulting flatworm will have two heads. Interestingly, future Planaria cut from the two-headed variant will also have two heads. However, editing the bioelectric pattern does not affect the anatomy of the current flatworm. So, the particular bioelectric pattern does not encode for the physical state of the current planarian, but rather for all future states, a phenomenon known as latent pattern memory.
