= Bis(5'-nucleosyl)-tetraphosphatase (asymmetrical) =

Class os enzymes

Identifiers
- EC no.: 3.6.1.17
- CAS no.: 37289-29-5

Databases
- BRENDA: enzyme data
- ExPASy: NiceZyme view
- KEGG: enzyme entry
- MetaCyc: metabolic pathway
- Rhea: reactions
- PDB structures: RCSB PDB PDBe PDBsum
- Gene Ontology: AmiGO / QuickGO
Search
- PMC: articles
- PubMed: articles
- NCBI: proteins

Bis(5'-nucleosyl)-tetraphosphatase (asymmetrical) (EC 3.6.1.17) is an enzyme originally characterised from brine shrimp that catalyzes the hydrolysis of P(1),P(4)-bis(5'-guanosyl) tetraphosphate in an asymmetrical manner, giving guanosine triphosphate and guanosine monophosphate:

P(1),P(4)-bis(5'-guanosyl) tetraphosphate
H_{2}O
guanosine triphosphate
+
guanosine monophosphate

The enzyme has also been found in mammals and plants. It also acts on the corresponding adenosine derivative and is part of the extracellular purinergic signalling process.

This enzyme is a hydrolase, specifically one acting on acid anhydrides in phosphorus-containing anhydrides. The systematic name of this enzyme class is P1,P4-bis(5'-nucleosyl)-tetraphosphate nucleotidohydrolase. Other names in use include bis(5'-guanosyl)-tetraphosphatase, bis(5'-adenosyl)-tetraphosphatase, diguanosinetetraphosphatase (asymmetrical), dinucleosidetetraphosphatase (asymmetrical), diadenosine P1,P4-tetraphosphatase, dinucleoside tetraphosphatase, and 1-P,4-P-bis(5'-nucleosyl)-tetraphosphate nucleotidohydrolase.

== Structural studies ==
As of late 2007, 7 structures have been solved for this class of enzymes, with PDB accession codes PDB: 1F3Y, PDB: 1JKN, PDB: 1KT9, PDB: 1KTG, PDB: 1XSA, PDB: 1XSB, and PDB: 1XSC.

== See also ==
- Bis(5'-nucleosyl)-tetraphosphatase (symmetrical) which catalyses similar reactions leading to two diphosphate molecules
