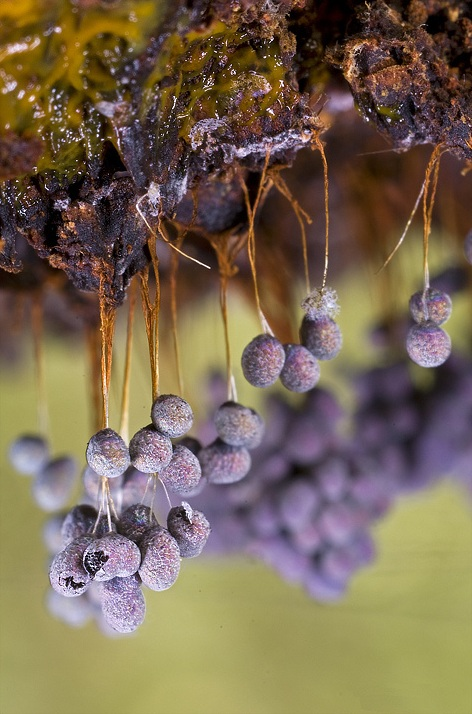

Scientific classification
- Domain: Eukaryota
- Phylum: Amoebozoa
- Class: Myxogastria
- Order: Physarales
- Family: Physaraceae
- Genus: Badhamia
- Species: B. utricularis

Binomial name
- Badhamia utricularis (Bull.) Berk.

= Badhamia utricularis =

Species of slime mould

Badhamia utricularis is a species of slime mold in the family Physaraceae. It was first described as Sphaerocarpus utricularis by Jean Baptiste François Pierre Bulliard in 1789, and was assigned to the genus Badhamia by Miles Joseph Berkeley in 1852. more Info about this- [https://www.naturespot.org/species/badhamia-utricularis]
