= Physarum polycephalum ribonuclease =

Identifiers
- EC no.: 3.1.26.1
- CAS no.: 9001-99-4

Databases
- IntEnz: IntEnz view
- BRENDA: BRENDA entry
- ExPASy: NiceZyme view
- KEGG: KEGG entry
- MetaCyc: metabolic pathway
- PRIAM: profile
- PDB structures: RCSB PDB PDBe PDBsum
Search
- PMC: articles
- PubMed: articles
- NCBI: proteins

Physarum polycephalum ribonuclease (EC 3.1.26.1) is an enzyme. This enzyme catalyses the following chemical reaction

Endonucleolytic cleavage to 5'-phosphomonoester

== See also ==
- Physarum polycephalum
