= Physarina =

Scientific classification
- Domain: Eukaryota
- Clade: Amorphea
- Phylum: Amoebozoa
- Class: Myxogastria
- Order: Physarales
- Family: Physaraceae
- Genus: Physarina; Höhn.

Genus of slime moulds

Physarina is a genus of slime molds in the family Physaraceae.

== Species ==
The following species are accepted by Species Fungorum:

- Physarina alboscabra Nann.-Bremek. & Y. Yamam.
- Physarina echinocephala Höhn.
- Physarina echinospora K.S. Thind & Manocha
