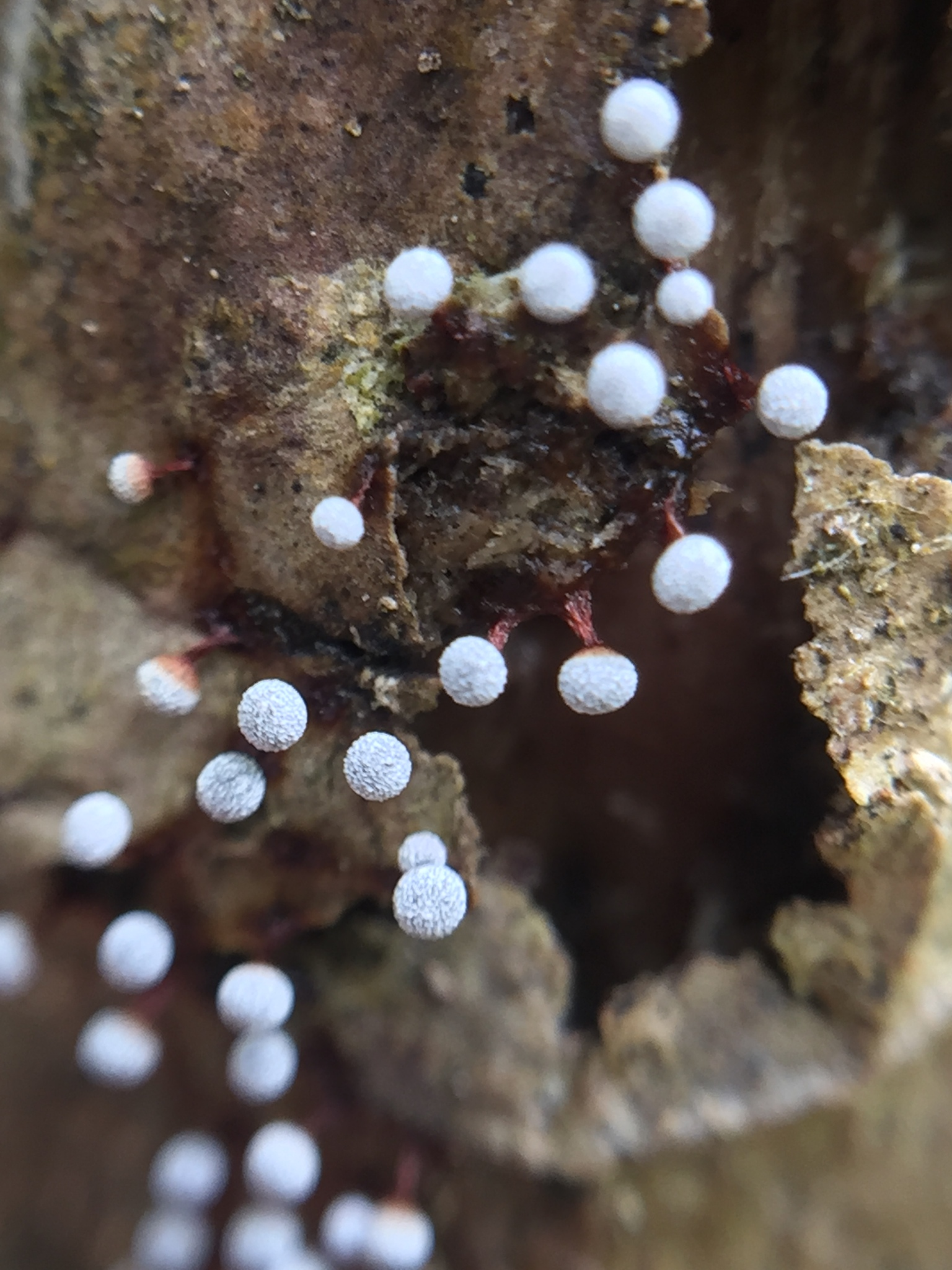
- On leaf litter, Hillsborough, Auckland

Scientific classification
- Domain: Eukaryota
- Phylum: Amoebozoa
- Class: Myxogastria
- Order: Physarales
- Family: Physaraceae
- Genus: Physarum
- Species: P. pusillum

Binomial name
- Physarum pusillum (Berk. & M.A.Curtis) G.Lister, 1911

= Physarum pusillum =

Species of amoebozoa

Physarum pusillum is a species of myxomycete (true slime mould) in the polyphyletic genus Physarum.

== Taxonomy ==
Physarum pusillum was first described by Miles Berkeley and M.A. Curtis in 1873 as Didymium pusillum. The holotype (K-1492) was collected from South Carolina and kept in the Kew herbarium, however, a comprehensive search of the herbarium in 2018 was unable to locate it. In 1911, the species was reassigned to Physarum by Gulielma Lister, with accompanying description and illustrations recognising two morphotypes: one with a subglobose sporotheca and another (rarer one) with a flatter, lenticular sporotheca. The latter "oblate" form was recognised as a distinct species in 2020 following morphological and molecular anyalyses, leading to the reinstatement of the name P. gravidum. Further morphological differences that distinguish P. gravidum from P. pusillum include: the presence of an umbilicus, thin lime nodes in the capillitium, and spores largely ornamented with more-or-less evenly distributed warts and occasional large, poorly defined clusters of warts.

Synonyms of Physarum pusillum include: Badhamia nodulosa, Craterium nodulosum, Physarum nodulosum, Physarum calidris, Lignydium calidris, and Physarum mucoroides.

== Description ==
The fruiting bodies of Physarum pusillum are a stalked sporangia, often gregarious, between 1–2 mm tall. Each sporocarp has subglobose sporotheca, approximately 0.4–0.5 mm in diameter, and a stalk that is membranous, limeless, longitudinally pleated, widened at the base, and standing either straight or with a slight curve at up to 1.3 mm tall. The upper half of the stalk is translucent and orange or reddish-brown, while the lower half is opaque and dark brown. Its peridium is a single layer and encrusted with granular white to grey-white lime, although it is often orange-brown or reddish-brown and limeless at the base. Its capillitium consists of enlarged, irregular lime nodes, filled with lime granules and connected by hyaline, branching threads. It does not have a columella or pseudocolumella. Spores are globose, black in mass and brown by transmitted light, 8.5–12.5 μm in diameter, and minutely warted. These warts are evenly distributed, with distinct groups of denser, larger warts. They are watery white as plasmodia.

== Habitat and distribution ==
Physarum pusillum is found on both herbaceous and woody plant debris, such as dead leaves and twigs, worldwide, including New Zealand, South Africa, Croatia, and South Africa. In general, P. pusillum favours warm temperate to tropical regions.
