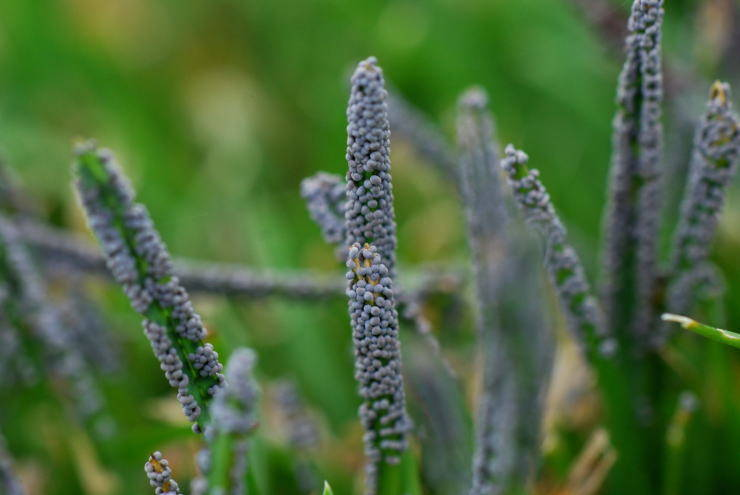

Scientific classification
- Domain: Eukaryota
- Clade: Amorphea
- Phylum: Amoebozoa
- Class: Myxogastria
- Order: Physarales
- Family: Physaraceae
- Genus: Physarum
- Species: P. cinereum

Binomial name
- Physarum cinereum (Batsch) Pers. (1794)

Synonyms
- Lycoperdon cinereum Batsch (1783); Didymium cinereum (Batsch) Fr. (1822 (1829); Badhamia cinerea (Batsch) J.Kickx f. (1867); Lignydium cinereum (Batsch) Kuntze (1898)

= Physarum cinereum =

Species of slime mould

Physarum cinereum is a slime mold that grows on turfgrass or beet but is not a pathogen.

== Taxonomy ==
The species was originally named Lycoperdon cinereum by August Johann Georg Karl Batsch in 1783; Christiaan Hendrik Persoon transferred it to Physarum in 1794.
