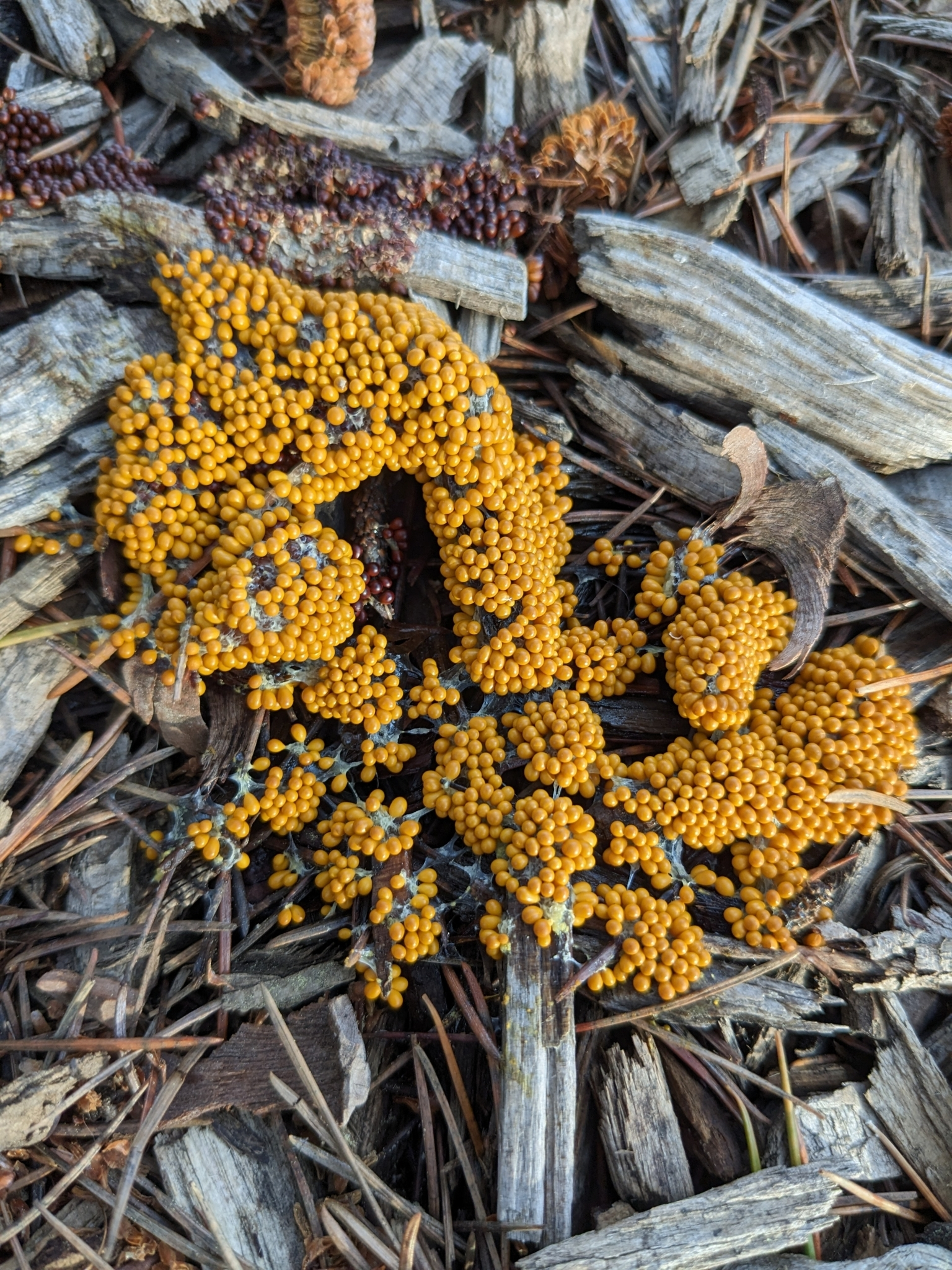

Scientific classification
- Domain: Eukaryota
- Supergroup: Amorphea
- Phylum: Amoebozoa
- Class: Myxogastria
- Order: Physarales
- Family: Physaraceae
- Genus: Leocarpus
- Species: L. fragilis

Binomial name
- Leocarpus fragilis (Dicks.) Rostaf.

= Leocarpus fragilis =

Species of slime mold

Leocarpus fragilis is a myxogastrid or acellular slime mold of the genus Leocarpus. The common name in English is insect-egg slime mold. L. fragilis can be found on leaf litter, typically in temperate and boreal forests where the ground litter is acidic. It has been found on all continents except Antarctica but is most commonly found in the northern hemisphere. Its round fruiting bodies are a recognizable yellow, orange-brown.
