= Cryptogene =

A cryptogene is a gene that has had its transcript edited. This phenomenon is observed in various organisms, particularly in Kinetoplastids and Myxomycetes, where the process plays a crucial role in mitochondrial gene expression.

== In Kinetoplastids ==
Kinetoplastids, a group of protozoans including Trypanosoma and Leishmania, possess an unusual genetic system in their mitochondria. This system is characterized by an elaborate network of circular DNA, organized into two distinct types of rings: maxicircles and minicircles.

- Maxicircles and Minicircles: The maxicircles are analogous to the mitochondrial DNA seen in other eukaryotes and contain genes essential for mitochondrial function. However, the transcripts of these maxicircle genes often do not directly yield functional proteins. The minicircles, on the other hand, are small and numerous, encoding guide RNAs (gRNAs).
- Role of Guide RNA: The gRNAs coded in the minicircles are essential for the post-transcriptional modification of the maxicircle transcripts. This modification includes RNA editing, where nucleotides are added, deleted, or substituted in the RNA sequence, thereby creating functional mitochondrial mRNAs.
- RNA Editing: The editing process is extensive and often completely alters the original RNA sequence, making the mature RNA significantly different from its DNA template. This process is crucial for the correct expression and function of mitochondrial genes in Kinetoplastids.

== In Myxomycetes ==
Myxomycetes, a group of slime molds which includes species like Physarum polycephalum, also exhibit cryptogenes in their mitochondria.

- Mitochondrial genes in Physarum polycephalum: The mitochondrial DNA of Physarum polycephalum comprises up to 81 genes, of which 43 are cryptogenes. These cryptogenes undergo a unique co-transcriptional editing process known as MICOTREM (Mitochondrial Insertional Cotranscriptional RNA Editing in Myxomycetes).
- MICOTREM Process: Unlike the RNA editing in Kinetoplastids, MICOTREM involves the insertional editing of RNA without the involvement of guide RNAs. Specific non-templated nucleotides are added to the RNA transcript at the editing sites by the mitochondrial RNA polymerase. These insertions predominantly consist of cytidines, but uridines or a subset of dinucleotides are also added. This mechanism differs significantly from post-transcriptional insertional editing systems found in other organisms, which rely on guide RNAs and involve RNA backbone cleavage and subsequent nucleotide insertion and ligation. The exact mechanism and origin of the editing sites in MICOTREM are not fully understood, with hypotheses involving RNA-DNA duplex formation and potential triplex formation. This complexity offers insights into the evolution of mitochondrial DNA and the diversity of RNA editing mechanisms.
