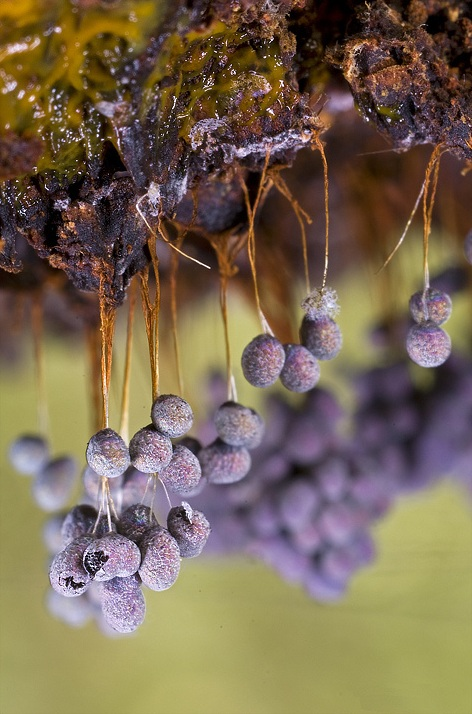
- Badhamia utricularis

Scientific classification
- Domain: Eukaryota
- Clade: Amorphea
- Phylum: Amoebozoa
- Class: Myxogastria
- Order: Physarales
- Family: Physaraceae
- Genus: Badhamia; Berk.

Type species
- Badhamia capsulifera Cooke

= Badhamia =

Genus of slime moulds

Badhamia is a genus of slime molds in the family Physaraceae. It was circumscribed by English naturalist Miles Joseph Berkeley in 1853. The widespread genus contains about 30 species.

== Species ==
- Badhamia affinis
- Badhamia apiculospora
- Badhamia bibasalis
- Badhamia bispora
- Badhamia calcaripes
- Badhamia capsulifera
- Badhamia cinerascens
- Badhamia crassipella
- Badhamia delicatula
- Badhamia dubia
- Badhamia foliicola
- Badhamia formosana
- Badhamia gigantospora
- Badhamia goniospora
- Badhamia grandispora
- Badhamia iowensis
- Badhamia lilacina
- Badhamia macrocarpa
- Badhamia macrospora
- Badhamia melanospora
- Badhamia nitens
- Badhamia ovispora
- Badhamia panicea
- Badhamia papaveracea
- Badhamia populina
- Badhamia rhytidosperma
- Badhamia rugulosa
- Badhamia spinispora
- Badhamia utricularis
- Badhamia versicolor
- Badhamia viridescens
