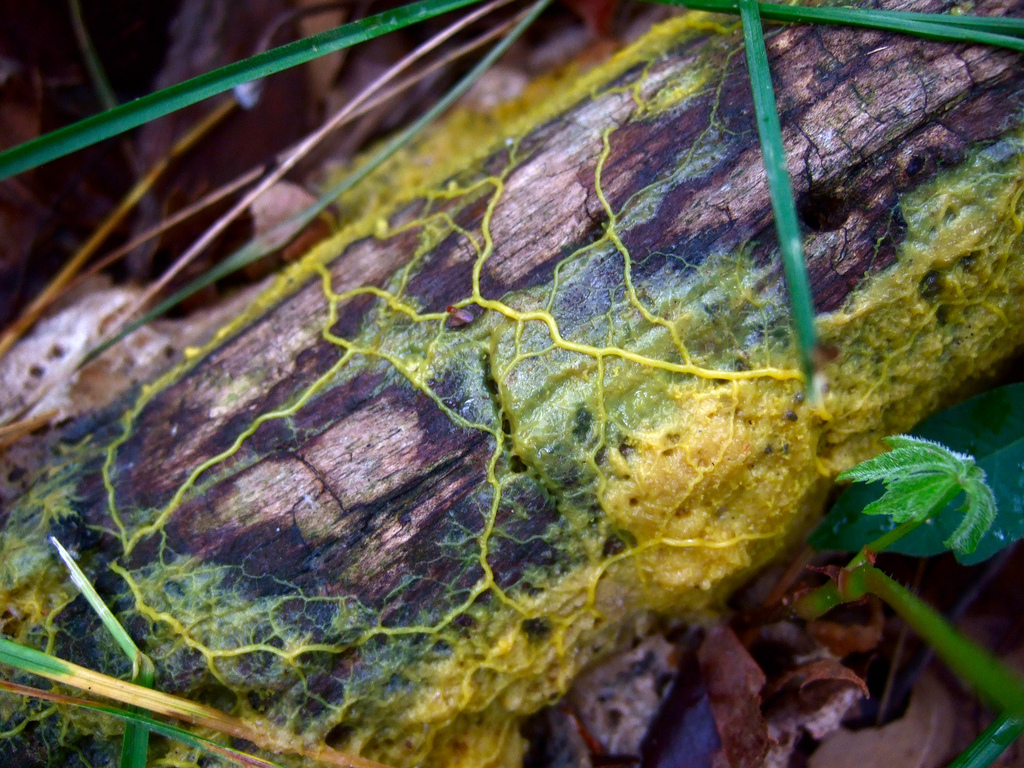
- P. polycephalum plasmodium on tree bark

Scientific classification
- Domain: Eukaryota
- Supergroup: Amorphea
- Phylum: Amoebozoa
- Class: Myxogastria
- Order: Physarales
- Family: Physaraceae
- Genus: Physarum
- Species: P. polycephalum

Binomial name
- Physarum polycephalum Schwein.

= Physarum polycephalum =

Species of slime mold, model organism

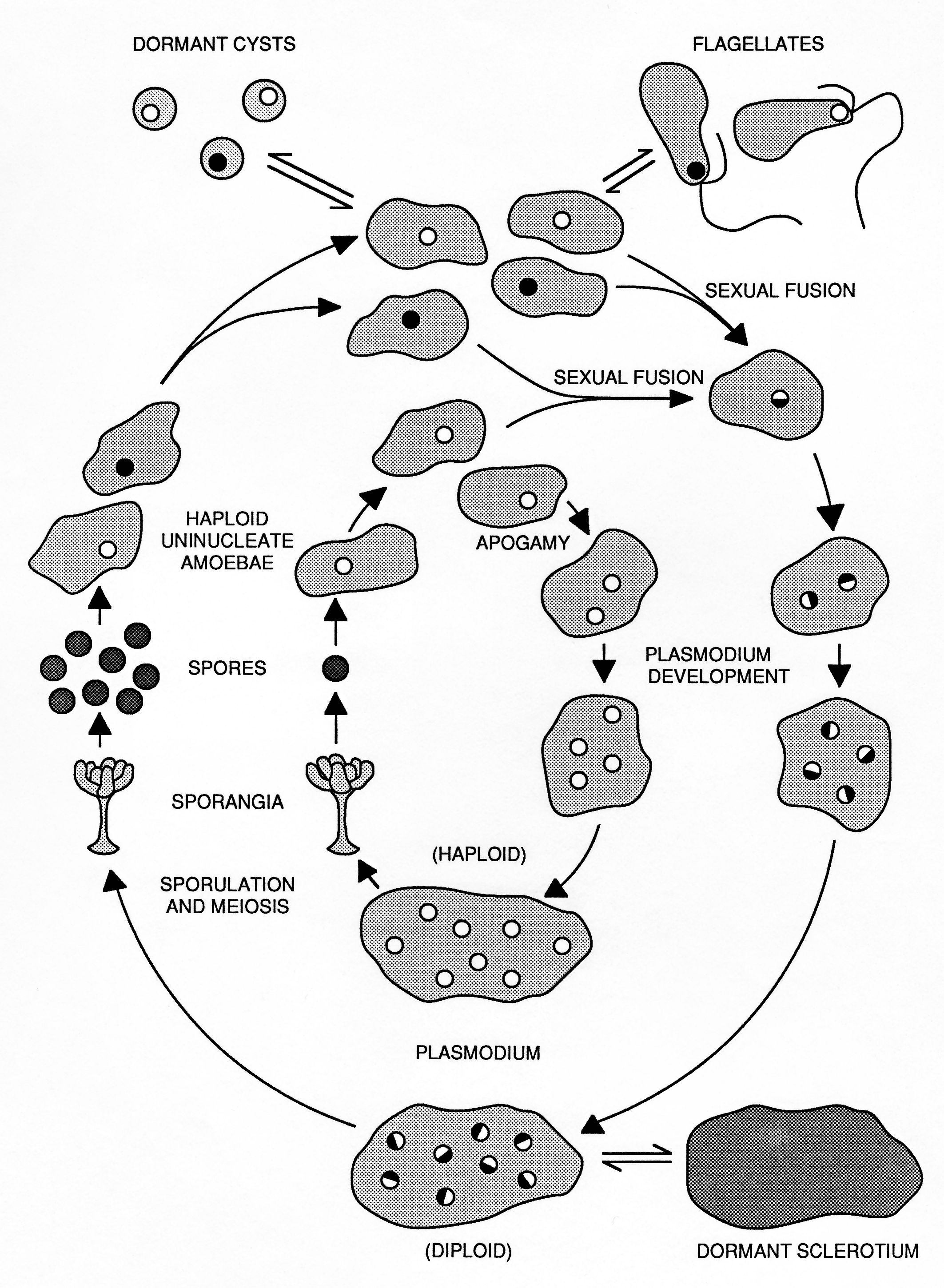
The life cycle of Physarum polycephalum. The outer circuit illustrates the natural cycle alternating between the haploid amoebal stage and diploid plasmodial stage. The inner circuit illustrates the fully haploid "apogamic" life cycle. Both cycles exhibit all developmental stages.

Physarum polycephalum, an acellular slime mold, or myxomycete, is an amoeba with diverse cellular forms and broad geographic distribution. The "acellular" moniker derives from the plasmodial stage of the life cycle: the plasmodium is a bright yellow macroscopic multinucleate coenocyte shaped in a network of interlaced tubes. This stage of the life cycle, along with its preference for damp shady habitats, likely contributed to the original mischaracterization of the organism as a fungus. P. polycephalum is used as a model organism for research into motility, cellular differentiation, chemotaxis, cellular compatibility, and the cell cycle. It is commonly cultivated.

== Life cycle and characteristics ==
The two vegetative cell types, amoebae and plasmodia, differ markedly in morphology, physiology and behavior. Amoebae are microorganisms, typically haploid, that live primarily in the soil, where they phagocytose bacteria. In the laboratory, amoebae are grown on lawns of live or dead Escherichia coli on nutrient agar plates, where they can multiply indefinitely. Axenic culture of amoebae was achieved through selection of mutants capable of axenic growth. Under conditions of starvation or desiccation, the amoebae differentiate reversibly into dormant spores with cell walls. When immersed in water, amoebae differentiate reversibly into flagellated cells, which involves a major reorganization of the cytoskeleton.

The plasmodium is typically diploid and propagates via growth and nuclear division without cytokinesis, resulting in the macroscopic multinucleate syncytium; in other words, a large single cell with multiple nuclei. While nutrients are available, the network-shaped plasmodium can grow to a foot or more in diameter. Like amoebae, the plasmodium can consume whole microbes, but also readily grows axenically in liquid cultures, nutrient agar plates and on nutrient-moistened surfaces. When nutrients are provided uniformly, the nuclei in the plasmodium divide synchronously, accounting for the interest in using P. polycephalum as a model organism to study the cell cycle, or more specifically the nuclear division cycle. When the plasmodium is starved, it has two alternative developmental pathways. In the dark, the plasmodium typically differentiates reversibly into a dormant sclerotium (the same term is used for dormant forms of fungal mycelia, but the myxomycete sclerotium is a very different structure). When exposed to light, the starving plasmodium differentiates irreversibly into sporangia that are distinguished from other Physarum species by their multiple heads (hence polycephalum). Meiosis occurs during spore development, resulting in haploid dormant spores. Upon exposure to moist nutrient conditions, the spores develop into amoebae, or, in aqueous suspension, into flagellates. The life cycle is completed when haploid amoebae of different mating types fuse to form a diploid zygote that then develops by growth and nuclear division in the absence of cytokinesis into the multinucleate plasmodium.

In laboratory strains carrying a mutation at the matA mating-type locus, the differentiation of P. polycephalum plasmodia can occur without the fusion of amoebae, resulting in haploid plasmodia that are morphologically indistinguishable from the more typical diploid form. This enables easier genetic analysis of plasmodial traits that would otherwise require backcrossing to achieve homozygosity for analysis of recessive mutations in diploids. Sporangia from haploid plasmodia generate spores with low fertility, and it is assumed that viable spores develop from meiosis of rare diploid nuclei in the otherwise haploid P. polycephalum plasmodia. Apogamic development can also occur in nature in various species of myxomycetes. In the figure of the P. polycephalum life cycle, the typical haploid-diploid sexual cycle is depicted in the outer circuit and the apogamic cycle in the inner circuit. Note that an apogamic amoeba retains its matA1 mating type specificity and can still fuse sexually with an amoeba of a different mating type to form a diploid heterozygous plasmodium—another characteristic that facilitates genetic analysis.

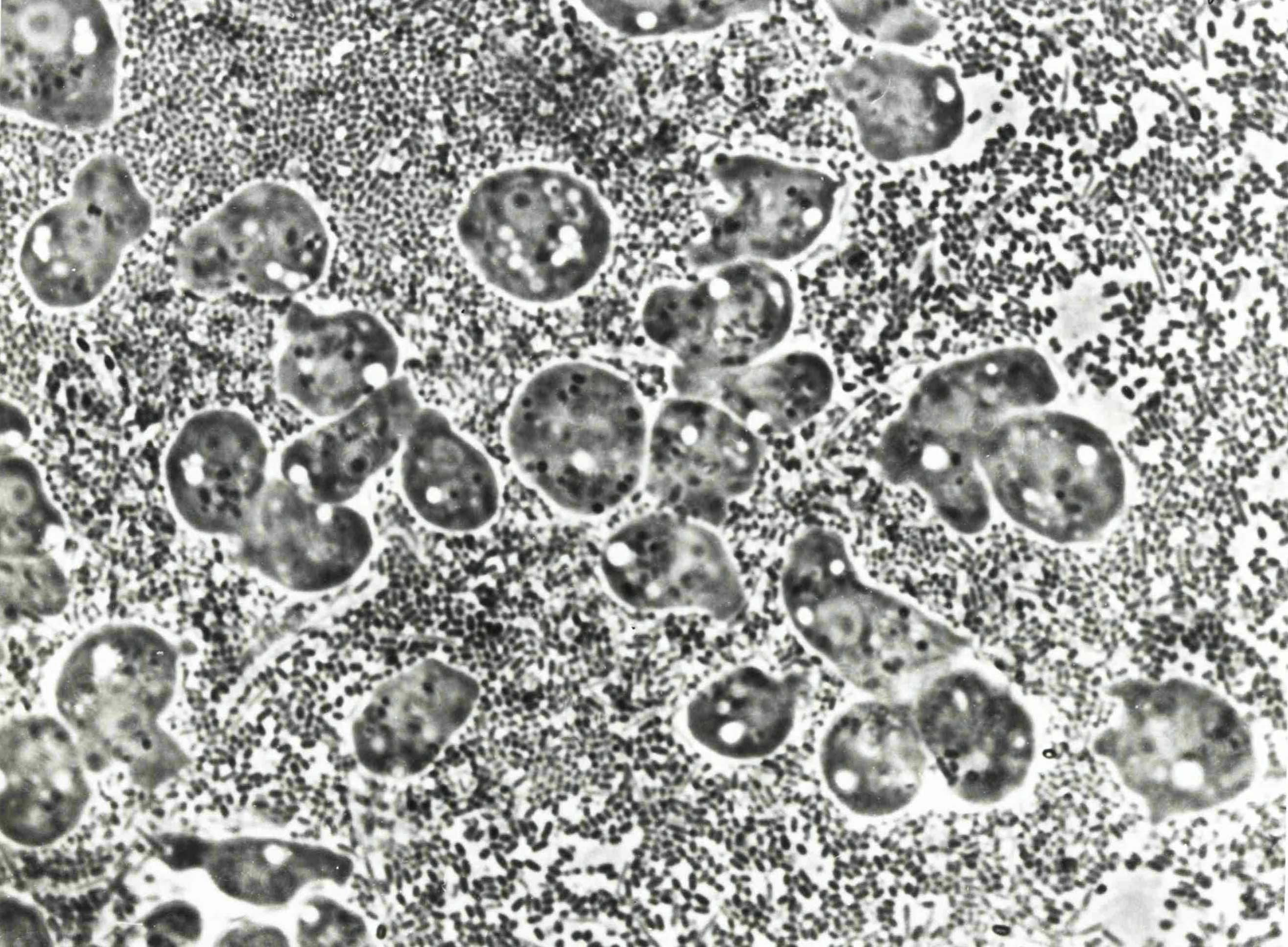
P. polycephalum amoebae growing on lawns of live E. coli. The bacterial cells are approx 1 micron in diameter, amoebae are approx 10 microns in diameter. Bright circular structures inside the amoebae are vacuoles, nuclei are pale grey circles each containing a darker nucleolus. (Phase contrast microscopy.)

As the life cycle diagram indicates, amoebae and plasmodia differ markedly in their developmental potential. A remarkable further difference is the mechanism of mitosis. Amoebae exhibit "open mitosis" during which the nuclear membrane breaks down, as is typical of animal cells, before reassembling after telophase. Plasmodia exhibit "closed mitosis" during which the nuclear membrane remains intact. This presumably prevents nuclear fusion from occurring during mitosis in the multinucleate syncytium. In support of this inference, mutant amoebae defective in cytokinesis develop into multinucleate cells, and nuclear fusions during mitosis are common in these mutants.

== Cytoplasmic streaming ==
The plasmodium of myxomycetes, and especially that of Physarum polycephalum is known for its cytoplasmic streaming. The cytoplasm undergoes a shuttle flow rhythmically flowing back and forth, changing direction typically every 100 seconds. Flows can reach speeds of up to 1 mm/s. Within the tubular network flows arise due to the cross-sectional contractions of the tubes that are generated by the contraction and relaxation of the membranous outer layer of the tubes enriched with acto-myosin cortex. In stationary plasmodia, tubular contractions are spatially organized across the entire plasmodium in a peristaltic wave.

Cytoplasmic streaming is likely to contribute to plasmodium migration. Here, contraction patterns are observed to correlate with migration speed. For dumbbell-shaped microplasmodia, often termed Amoeboid plasmodia, stiffening of the cortex in the rear versus the front seems instrumental in breaking the symmetry for the contraction wave to translate into migration.

Cytoplasmic flows enable long-ranged transport and dispersion of molecules within the cytoplasm. The physical mechanism employed here is Taylor dispersion. Under starvation the organism may reorganize its network morphology and thereby enhance its dispersion capabilities. In fact, the flows are even hijacked to transport signals throughout the plasmodium network. It is likely that the feedback of transported signals on tube size underlies Physarum's capability to find the shortest path through a maze.

== Situational behavior ==
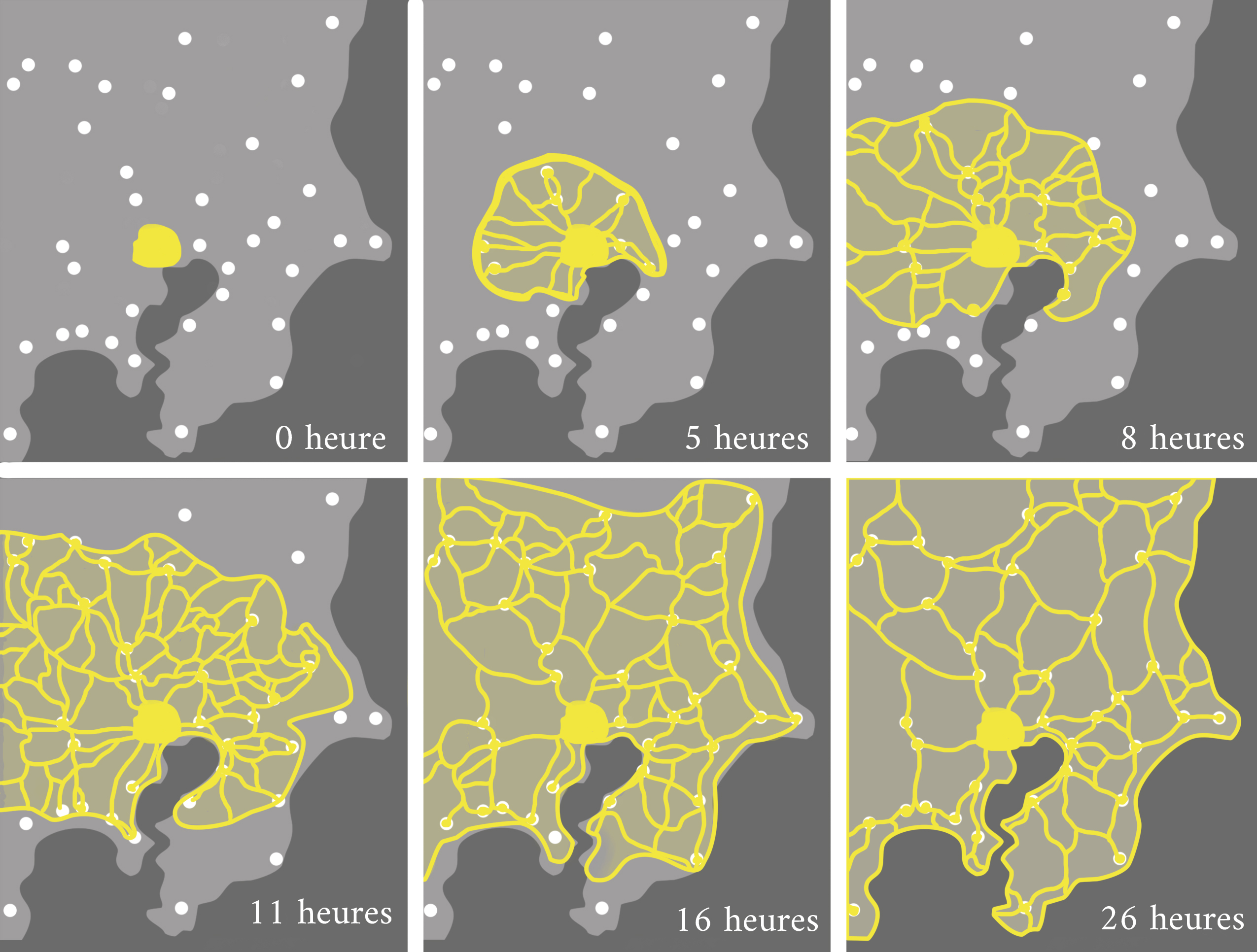
Network created (Steiner tree problem) by P. polycephalum

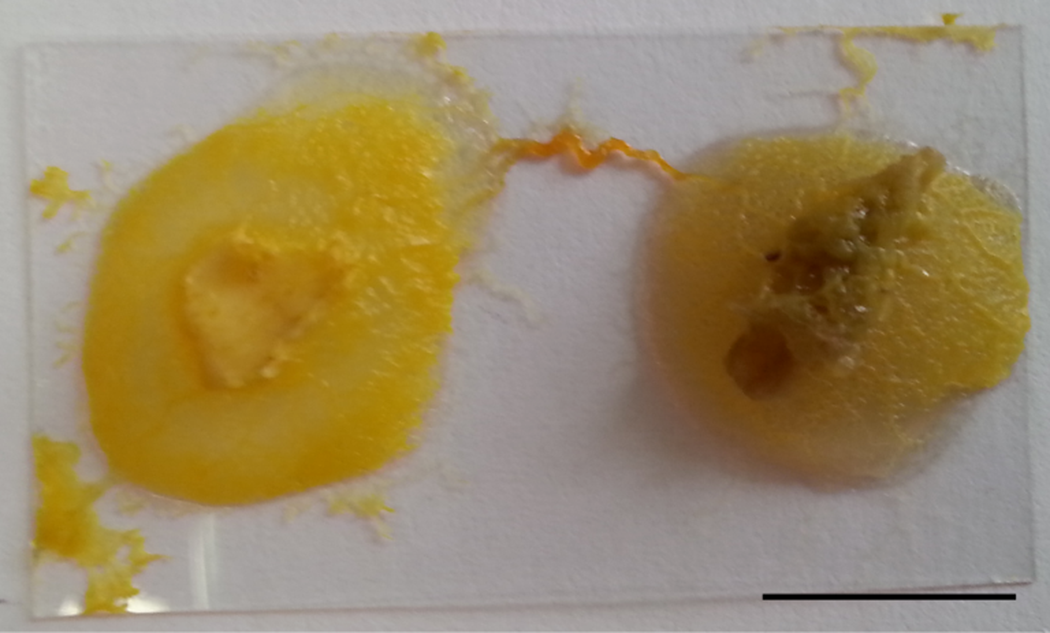
P. polycephalum plasmodium cultivating two "islands" of agar substrate overlying a glass coverslip

Physarum polycephalum growing from an oat flake (center) towards hairy roots of the plant Valeriana officinalis (left)

Physarum polycephalum has been shown to exhibit characteristics similar to those seen in single-celled creatures and eusocial insects. For example, a team of Japanese and Hungarian researchers have shown P. polycephalum can solve the shortest path problem. When grown in a maze with oatmeal at two spots, P. polycephalum retracts from everywhere in the maze, except the shortest route connecting the two food sources.

When presented with more than two food sources, P. polycephalum apparently solves a more complicated transportation problem. With more than two sources, the amoeba also produces efficient networks. In a 2010 paper, oatflakes were dispersed to represent Tokyo and 36 surrounding towns. P. polycephalum created a network similar to the existing train system, and "with comparable efficiency, fault tolerance, and cost". Similar results have been shown based on road networks in the United Kingdom and the Iberian Peninsula (i.e., Spain and Portugal). P. polycephalum not only can solve these computational problems but also has been shown to anticipate periodic stimuli. By repeatedly making the test environment of a specimen of P. polycephalum cold and dry for 10 minutes in every 60 , causing a significant decrease in locomotion speed, Hokkaido University biophysicists discovered that the slime mold appears to anticipate the pattern by demonstrating the same slowing response when conditions were then not changed at the next interval. 30 and 90 minute intervals were tested, and the mold would continue to slow in anticipation of condition changes (dubbed 'spontaneous in-phase slowdown') up to seven times. A mathematical model was created to explore the possible metabolic origins of this behaviour.

P. polycephalum has also been shown to dynamically re-allocate to apparently maintain constant levels of different nutrients simultaneously. In one particular instance, a specimen placed at the center of a Petri dish spatially re-allocated over combinations of food sources that each had different protein-carbohydrate ratios. After 60 hours, the slime mold area over each food source was measured. For each specimen, the results were consistent with the hypothesis that the amoeba would balance total protein and carbohydrate intake to reach particular levels that were invariant to the actual ratios presented to the slime mold.

As the slime mold does not have any nervous system that could explain these intelligent behaviours, there has been considerable interdisciplinary interest in understanding the rules that govern its behaviour. Scientists are trying to model the slime mold using a number of simple, distributed rules. For example, P. polycephalum has been modeled as a set of differential equations inspired by electrical networks. This model can be shown to be able to compute shortest paths. A very similar model can be shown to solve the Steiner tree problem. However, these models are externally consistent but not internally explanatory, and as is usual for modelling they simplify — in this case assuming conservation of energy. To build more realistic models, more data about the slime mold's network construction needs to be gathered. To this end, researchers are analysing the network structure of lab-grown P. polycephalum.

In a book and several preprints that have not been peer-reviewed, it has been claimed that because plasmodia appear to react in a consistent way to stimuli, they are the "ideal substrate for future and emerging bio-computing devices". An outline has been presented showing how it may be possible to precisely point, steer and cleave plasmodium using light and food sources, especially Valerian root. Moreover, it has been reported that plasmodia can be made to form logic gates, enabling the construction of biological computers. In particular, plasmodia placed at entrances to special geometrically shaped mazes would emerge at exits of the maze that were consistent with truth tables for certain primitive logic connectives. However, as these constructions are based on theoretical models of the slime mold, in practice these results do not scale to allow for actual computation. When the primitive logic gates are connected to form more complex functions, the plasmodium ceased to produce results consistent with the expected truth tables.

Even though complex computations using Physarum as a substrate are currently not possible, researchers have successfully used the organism's reaction to its environment in a USB sensor and to control a robot.

== Innate immunity ==
P. polycephalum produces its own antiviral substances. Mayhew & Ford 1971 find an extract of P. polycephalum prevents some crop diseases: Tobacco mosaic virus and tobacco ringspot virus are inhibited by a product of P. polycephalum. Both Nicotiana tabacum and the beans Phaseolus vulgaris and Vigna sinensis suffered almost no lesioning in vitro from TMV or TRSV when treated with a P. polycephalum extract. However, the southern bean mosaic virus was unaffected.

== Mitochondrial DNA ==
P. polycephalum exhibits a complex mitochondrial DNA (mtDNA) structure that is distinctive in both its composition and functional mechanisms. The mtDNA of Physarum polycephalum is characterized by its unique RNA editing process.

The mtDNA of P. polycephalum comprises up to 81 genes, of which a significant number are cryptogenes that require RNA editing for functional expression. These employ the co-transcriptional RNA editing process known as MICOTREM (Mitochondrial Insertional Cotranscriptional RNA Editing in Myxomycetes). This process is crucial for the expression of 43 cryptogenes within the mtDNA. Unlike other organisms where RNA editing typically involves guide RNAs, MICOTREM involves the insertional editing of RNA, where specific non-templated nucleotides are added to the RNA transcript. The mitochondrial RNA polymerase facilitates this process by adding cytidines, uridines, or a subset of dinucleotides to the nascent RNA transcript at specific editing sites. The exact mechanism and specification of editing sites in MICOTREM are complex and not fully understood, with ongoing research focusing on the potential mechanisms involving RNA-DNA duplex formation and the role of mitochondrial RNA polymerase.

The mtDNA in this organism also includes sequences derived from a linear mitochondrial plasmid.

== See also ==
- Sedolisin
- Physarum polycephalum ribonuclease

== Sources ==
- Gawlitta, W.; Wolf, K.V.; Hoffmann, H.U.; Stockem, W. (1980). "Studies on microplasmodia of Physarum polycephalum". Cell and Tissue Research. 209 (1): 71–86. doi:10.1007/bf00219924. PMID 7191783. S2CID 23561113.
- Henry Stempen; Steven L. Stevenson (1994). Myxomycetes. A Handbook of Slime Molds. Timber Press. ISBN 978-0-88192-439-8.
