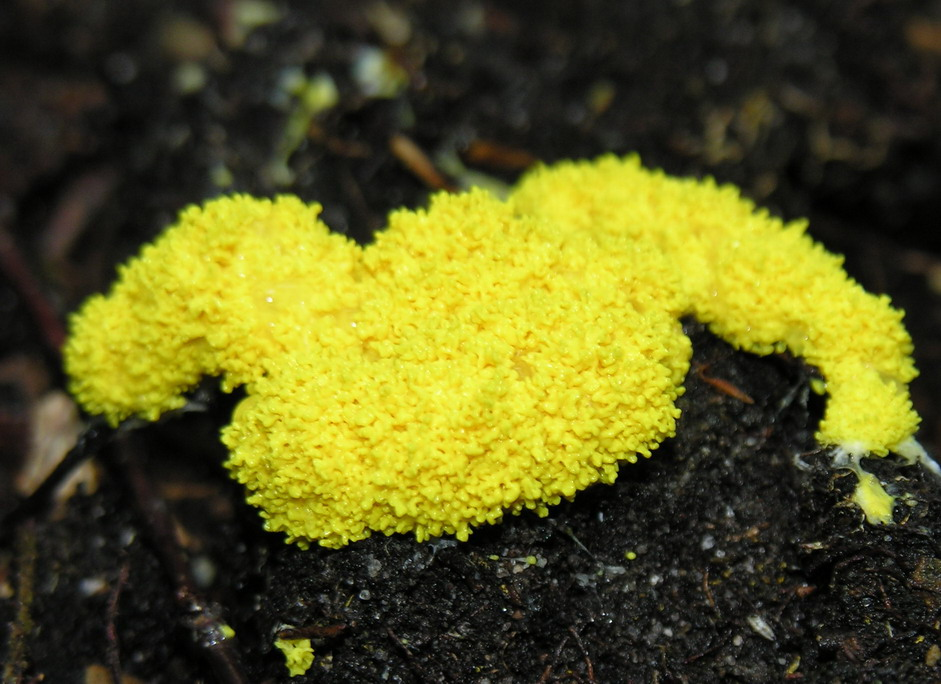
- Fuligo septica

Scientific classification
- Domain: Eukaryota
- Clade: Amorphea
- Phylum: Amoebozoa
- Class: Myxogastria
- Order: Physarales
- Family: Physaraceae
- Genus: Fuligo; Haller (1768)

= Fuligo =

Genus of slime moulds

Fuligo is a widespread genus of plasmodial slime mold in the family Physaraceae. These organisms are protozoans rather than fungi, but for historical reasons are sometimes treated as part of mycology.

== Species ==
The following species are accepted by Species Fungorum:

- Fuligo aurea (Penz.) Y. Yamam. (1998)
- Fuligo candida Pers. (1796)
- Fuligo cinerea (Schwein.) Morgan (1896)
- Fuligo flava Pers. (1794)
- Fuligo gyrosa E. Jahn (1902)
- Fuligo intermedia T.Macbr. (1922)
- Fuligo leviderma H. Neubert, Nowotny & K. Baumann (1995)
- Fuligo luteonitens L.G. Krieglst. & Nowotny (1995)
- Fuligo lycoperdon (Bull.) Schumach. (1803)
- Fuligo megaspora Sturgis (1913)
- Fuligo muscorum Alb. & Schwein. (1805)
- Fuligo ochracea (Peck) Peck (1878)
- Fuligo plumbea Schumach. (1803)
- Fuligo rufa Pers. (1794)
- Fuligo septica (L.) F.H.Wigg (1780)
- Fuligo varians Sommerf. (1826)
