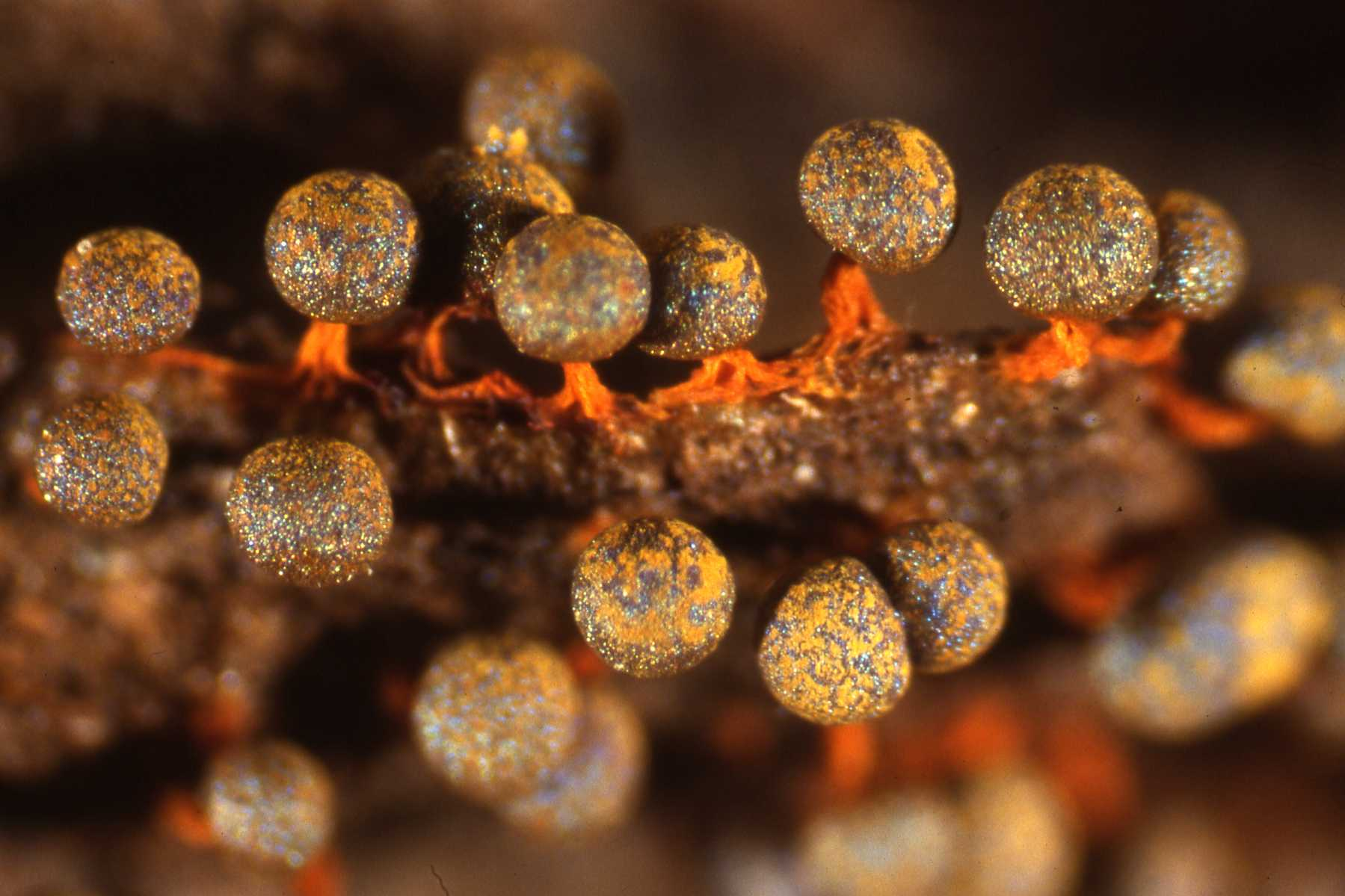
- Physarum psittacinum

Scientific classification
- Domain: Eukaryota
- Supergroup: Amorphea
- Phylum: Amoebozoa
- Class: Myxogastria
- Order: Physarales
- Family: Physaraceae
- Genus: Physarum; Pers.

Species
- Physarum albescens; Physarum album; Physarum andinum; Physarum bivalve; Physarum bogoriense; Physarum cinereum; Physarum citrinum; Physarum compressum; Physarum confertum; Physarum conglomeratum; Physarum crateriforme; Physarum daamsii; Physarum didermoides; Physarum digitatum; Physarum flavicomum; Physarum florigerum; Physarum globuliferum; Physarum gyrosum; Physarum hongkongense; Physarum lakhanpalii; Physarum lateritium; Physarum leucophaeum; Physarum loratum; Physarum luteolum; Physarum melleum; Physarum mortonii; Physarum mutabile; Physarum nigripodum; Physarum nucleatum; Physarum oblatum; Physarum plicatum; Physarum polycephalum; Physarum psittacinum; Physarum pulcherrimum; Physarum pusillum; Physarum reniforme; Physarum rigidum; Physarum roseum; Physarum stellatum; Physarum sulphureum; Physarum superbum; Physarum tenerum; Physarum virescens; Physarum viride

= Physarum =

Genus of slime moulds

Physarum is the largest genus of mycetozoan slime molds in the family Physaraceae. They typically thrive in cool, dark, and humid environments, including the bark of trees (often where moss is present), dead twigs, rotting logs covered with moss, leaf litter, and moist forest soils. The name Physarum comes from the Greek word φυσα (physa), which means "blister" or "bubble", referring to the bubble-like appearance of its sporangia.

== Phylogeny ==
Physarum is classified not as a fungus, but as a slime mold belonging to the Amoebozoa. Phylogenetic studies of Unikonts indicate that acellular slime molds like Physarum are related to cellular slime molds such as Dictyostelium, as well as other members of the Amoebozoa.

Analyses of ribosomal DNA (rDNA) sequences show that Physarum is polyphyletic, forming at least three distinct clades. Support for the polyphyletic origin of Physarum comes from a synapomorphy: the highly conserved G-binding site of L2449 group I intron ribozymes.

| Maximum-Likelihood phylogenetic tree of Physarales isolates based on the combined SSU/LSU data set | RNA structure diagrams of L2449 group I introns in Physarales clades |

== Life cycle ==
Physarum’s life cycle alternates between a haploid unicellular stage (amoeboid or flagellated cells) and a diploid multinucleate stage (plasmodium). Under favorable conditions, mature sporangia release spores that germinate into amoeboid cells. In dry environments, these cells form dormant microcysts capable of withstanding dehydration and nutrient scarcity, remaining viable until conditions improve, at which point they revive into active amoebae. Conversely, in excessively wet conditions, cells develop flagella and transition to a free-swimming form.

Cell fusion (syngamy or fertilization) between compatible cells gives rise to the multinucleate plasmodium. Under adverse conditions, such as desiccation, low temperature, or nutrient limitation, the plasmodium transforms into a hardened structure called a sclerotium, which remains dormant until conditions become favorable. When environmental conditions permit, the mature plasmodium forms sporangia, where spores are produced through meiosis. The release of these spores marks the start of a new life cycle.

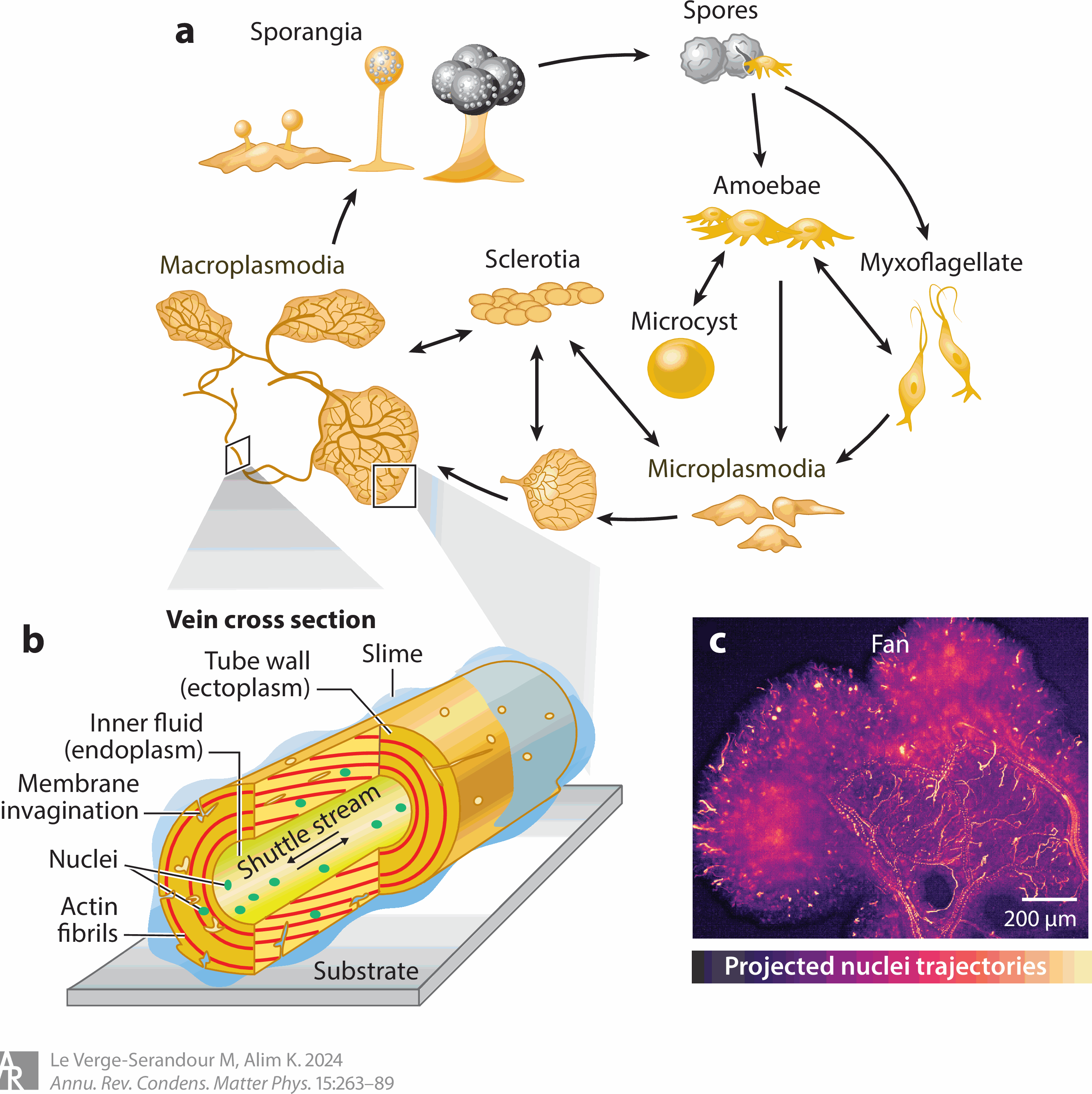
Physarum developmental cycle and cellular organization
