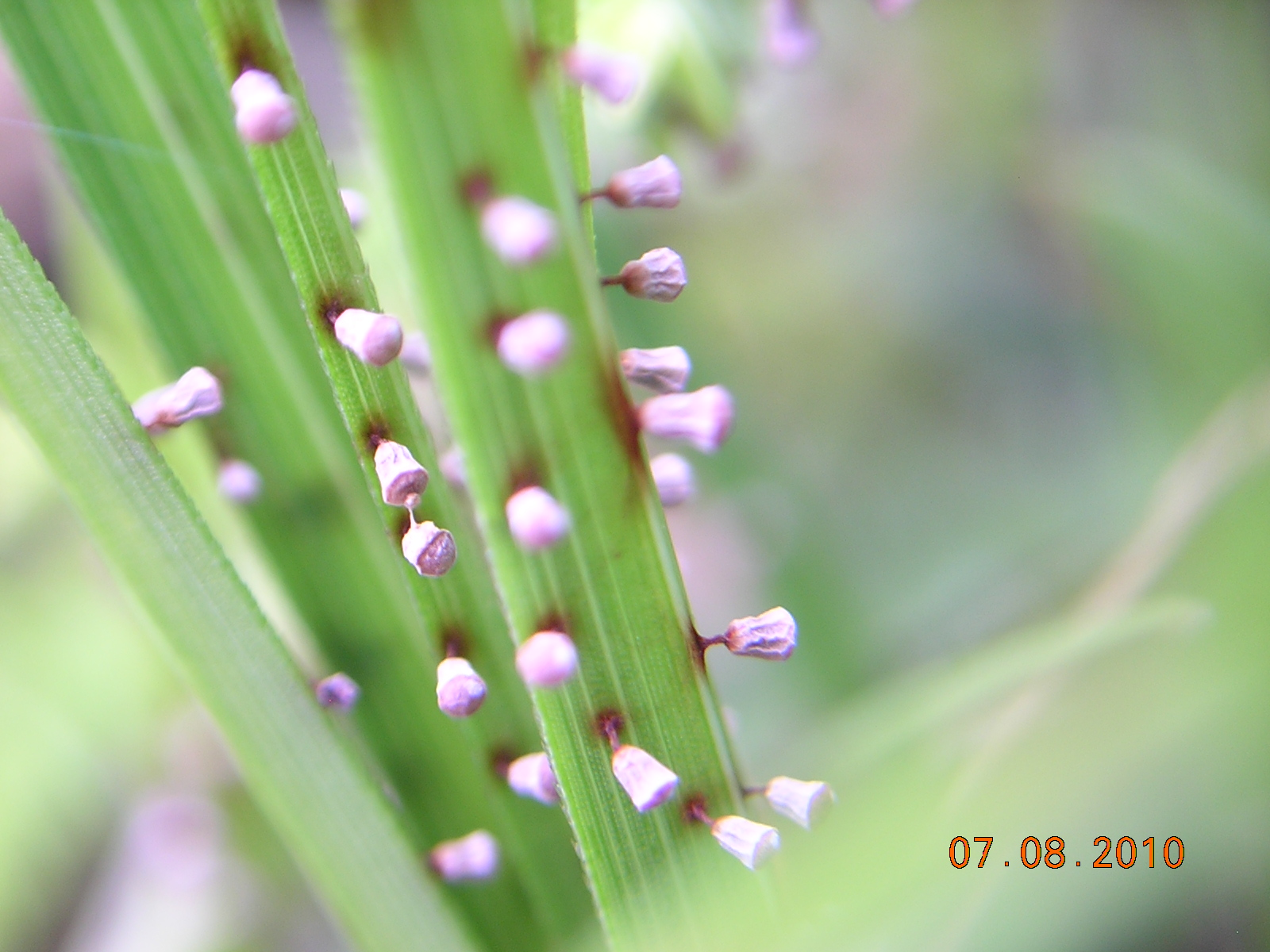
- Craterium sp.

Scientific classification
- Domain: Eukaryota
- Supergroup: Amorphea
- Phylum: Amoebozoa
- Class: Myxogastria
- Order: Physarales
- Family: Physaraceae
- Genus: Craterium; Trentep.

Synonyms
- List: Cupularia Link; Iocraterium E.Jahn; Nidularia With.; Scyphium Rostaf.; Sphaerocarpa H.C.F.Schumacher

= Craterium =

Genus of slime mould

Craterium is a genus of slime molds belonging to the family Physaraceae. The genus has a cosmopolitan distribution.

The genus was first described in 1797 by Johann Friedrich Trentepohl in Catalecta botanica quibus plantae novae et minus cognitae describuntur atque illustrantur.

== Species ==
The following species are recognised in the genus Craterium:

- Craterium atrolucens Flatau
- Craterium aureomagnum Hooff & Nann.-Bremek.
- Craterium aureonucleatum Nann.-Bremek.
- Craterium aureum (Schumach.) Rostaf.
- Craterium aureum Fuckel
- Craterium concinnum Rex
- Craterium corniculatum B.Zhang & Yu Li
- Craterium costatum Dhillon & Nann.-Bremek.
- Craterium dictyosporum (Rostaf.) H.Neubert, Nowotny & K.Baumann
- Craterium leucocephalum (Pers. ex J.F.Gmel.) Ditmar
- Craterium leucocephalum Grev.
- Craterium microcarpum H.Z.Li, Yu Li & Shuang L.Chen
- Craterium minutum (Leers) Fr.
- Craterium muscorum Ing
- Craterium obovatum Peck
- Craterium paraguayense (Speg.) G.Lister
- Craterium reticulatum Nann.-Bremek. & Y.Yamam.
- Craterium retisporum G.Moreno, D.W.Mitch. & S.L.Stephenson
- Craterium rubronodum G.Lister
- Craterium subpurpurea B.Zhang & Yu Li
- Craterium yichunense S.Y.Liu, F.Y.Zhao & Y.Li
