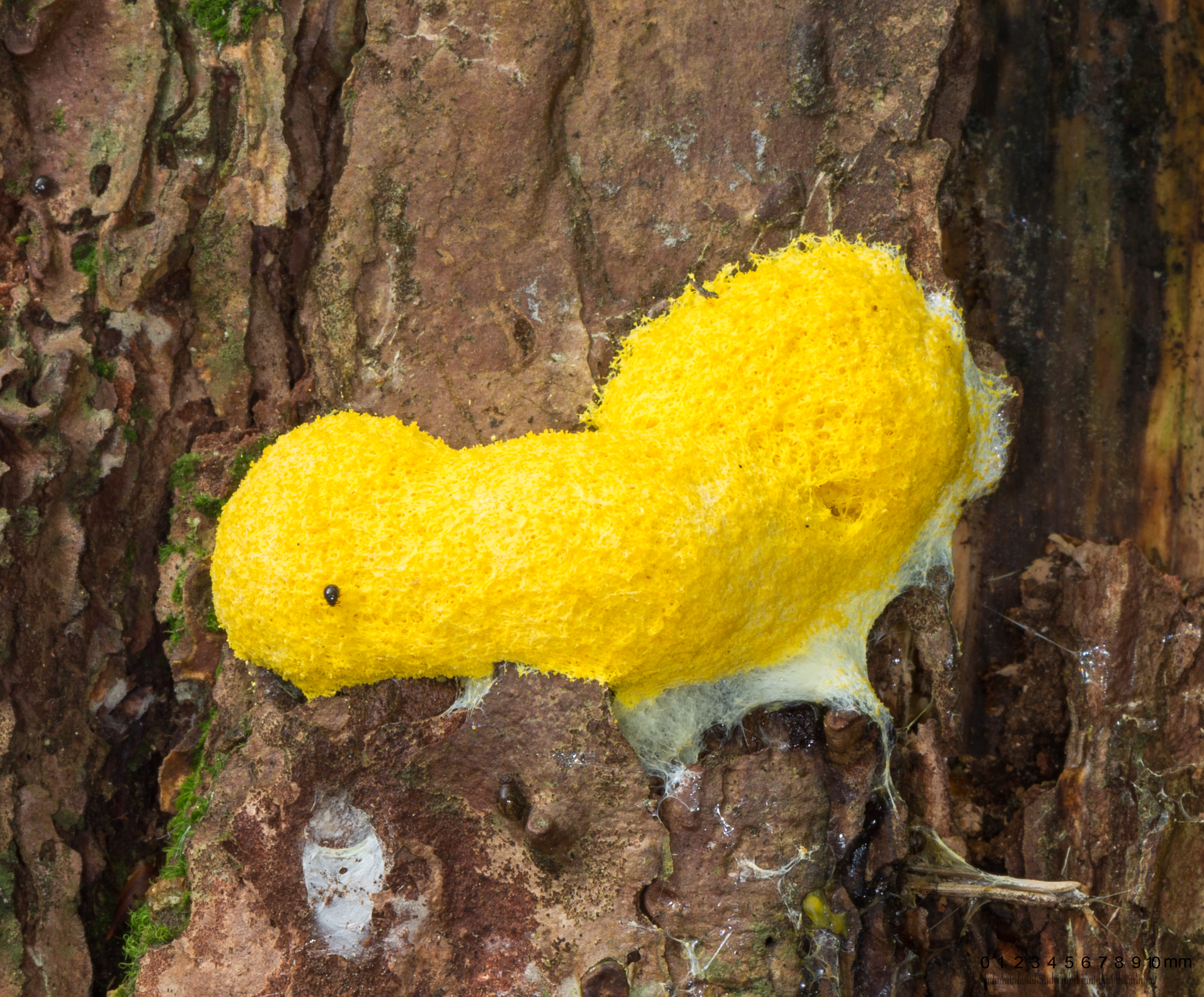
- Fuligo septica as white/yellow plasmodium

Scientific classification
- Domain: Eukaryota
- Supergroup: Amorphea
- Phylum: Amoebozoa
- Class: Myxogastria
- Order: Physarales
- Family: Physaraceae
- Genus: Fuligo
- Species: F. septica

Binomial name
- Fuligo septica (L.) F.H.Wigg (1780)

Synonyms
- Mucor septicus L. (1763); Reticularia septica (L.) With. (1792); Aethalium septicum (L.) Fr. (1829)

= Fuligo septica =

Species of slime mould

Fuligo septica is a species of slime mold in the class Myxomycetes. It is commonly known as scrambled egg slime or flowers of tan because of its peculiar yellowish appearance; it is also known as dog vomit slime mold. This slime mold is relatively common with a worldwide distribution, often being found on bark, mulch, lawns, as well as other rotting organic matter in urban areas after heavy rain or excessive watering. Their spores are produced on or in aerial sporangia and are spread by wind.

== History and taxonomy ==
The first description of the species was provided by French botanist Jean Marchant in 1727, who referred to it as "fleur de tan" (bark flower); Marchant also classified it as "des éponges" (one of the sponges). Carl Linnaeus called it Mucor septicus in his 1763 Species Plantarum. The species was transferred to the genus Fuligo by German botanist Friedrich Heinrich Wiggers in 1780.

== Description and habitat ==
Like many slime molds, the cells of this species typically aggregate to form a plasmodium, a multinucleate mass of undifferentiated cells that may move in an ameboid-like fashion during the search for nutrients. F. septica's plasmodium may be anywhere from white to yellow-gray, typically 2.5–20 cm (1.0–7.9 in) in diameter, and 1–3 cm (0.4–1.2 in) thick. The plasmodium eventually transforms into a sponge-like aethalium, analogous to the spore-bearing fruiting body of a mushroom; which then degrades, darkening in color, and releases its dark-colored spores. F. septica produces the largest aethalium of any slime mold. This species is known to have its spores dispersed by beetles (family Latridiidae).

The spores have a two-layered wall, with a dense outer layer with spines, and a fibrous inner layer. During germination, the outer layer splits to create an opening, and more elastic inner layer ruptures later as protoplasm emerges. A remnant of the inner layer may be persistent and adhere to the protoplast after it has emerged from the spore. A peroxidase enzyme present in the inner cell wall plays a role in germination.

Fuligo septica grows on rotten wood and plant debris, but can also grow on the leaves and stems of living plants. It is not pathogenic to plants.

The plasmodium will disappear and break down as the weather dries. When the slime mold appears in lawns and gardens, no control is necessary, though its breakdown may be quickened by breaking the plasmodium apart with a rake.

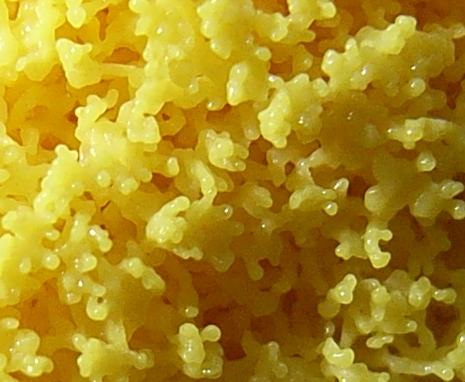
Close-up of the yellow plasmodium

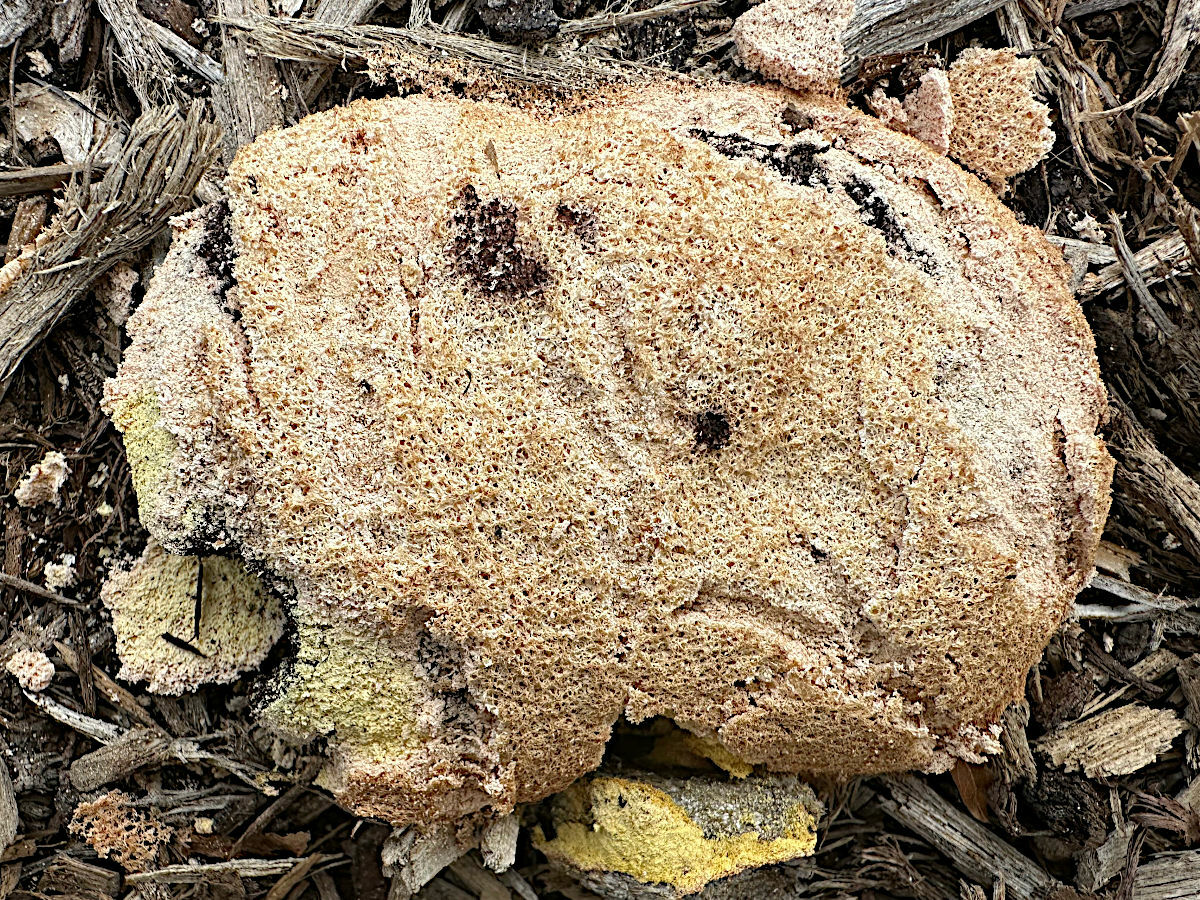
Dark-colored aethalium

== Resistance to metal toxicity ==
Slime molds can have a high resistance to toxic levels of metals; one author was prompted to write "The levels of zinc in Fuligo septica were so high (4,000–20,000 ppm) that it is difficult to understand how a living organism can tolerate them." The resistance to extreme levels of zinc appears to be unique to F. septica. The mechanism of this metal resistance is now understood: F. septica produces a yellow pigment called fuligorubin A, which has been shown to chelate metals and convert them to inactive forms.

== Bioactive compounds ==
Extracts from F. septica show activity against Bacillus subtilis and Candida albicans, and cytotoxic activity on KB cells (a cell line derived from a human carcinoma of the nasopharynx).

Fuligo septica contains a yellow pigment called fuligorubin A that is thought to be involved in photoreception and perhaps in the process of converting light into usable energy. In 2011, a Japanese research group reported isolating and characterizing a new organochlorine yellow pigment (dehydrofuligoic acid) from a specific strain of the organism.

== Relationship to humans ==
=== Folklore ===
In Scandinavian folklore, Fuligo septica is identified as the vomit of troll cats.

In Finland, the mold was believed to be used by witches to spoil their neighbors' milk. This gave it the name "paranvoi" (butter of the familiar spirit).

Similarly, Swedish folklore labels Tremella mesenterica as the vomit of a witch's 'carrier.'

Both are referred to in Dutch as "heksenboter" (witches' butter), and in Latvian "ragansviests" (witches' butter) or "raganu spļāviens" (witches' spit).

=== Human pathogenicity ===
The species is known to trigger episodes of asthma and allergic rhinitis in susceptible people.

=== Model of RNA processing ===
Introns are sections of DNA that must be properly cleaved, digested and processed prior to rendering functional mRNAs for protein synthesis. Because it has a large number of group I introns, F. septica is used as a model to understand the processing and evolution of RNA.

=== Medicinal and culinary use ===
There are some reports of its use as medicine (to treat boils) or as food.
