= Jean Marchant =

French botanist (1650–1738)

Jean Marchant (1650 – 11 November 1738) was a French botanist. Along with his father Nicolas Marchant, he was responsible for preparing the Histoire des plantes from 1667 begun under the aegis of the French Royal Academy of Sciences with the support of Claude Perrault. He named the liverwort genus Marchantia after his father.

== Biography ==
Jean was the son of the botanist Nicolas Marchant (died 1678) and his career was closely linked to that of his father. Nicolas was educated at the University of Padua and trained as an apothecary serving under Gaston, Duke of Orléans. He then worked at the botanical garden of the Duke at Blois collaborating with Abel Brunyer, Robert Morison and Jean Laugier. After the death of the Duke in 1660 he served the King and was involved in the founding of the French Academy of Sciences, serving as the only botanist until Denis Dodart recruited in 1673. He was given the position of “concierge et directeur de la culture des plantes du Jardin Royal" from 1674. In 1667, a project was begun by the Academy to produce the Mémoires pour servir à l'histoire des plantes but when Nicolas died, Jean was elected as replacement to the Academy on 18 June 1678 and immediately continued to work on the project at the Jardin des Plantes where he also served as director. Support for the project however ended in 1694 and the position at the Jardin was also discontinued. Without a pension, Marchant then continued to work on the project alone and independently but died before he could finish it. Although most of his work was unpublished, the Academy did release about 15 of his writings. His work on “Observations sur la nature des plantes” looked at changes in plants was considered especially important for introducing the idea of changes in plant characteristics from earlier assumptions on the fixity of forms. Marchant described a change in the form of Mercurialis annua in 1715 in the shape of the leaves.

Marchant described the species Fuligo septica. He named the genus Marchantia after his father.
