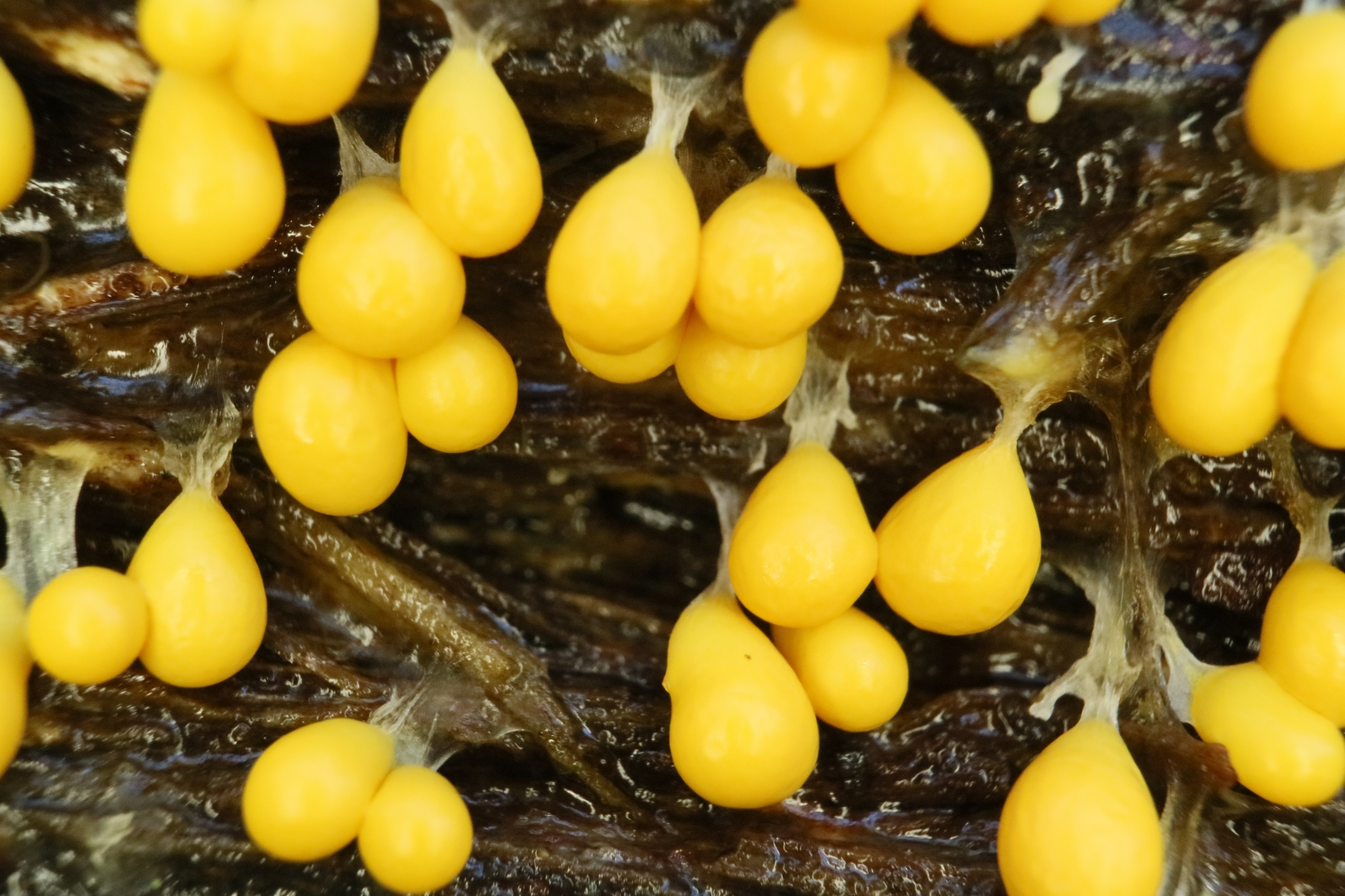
- Leocarpus fragilis

Scientific classification
- Domain: Eukaryota
- Clade: Amorphea
- Phylum: Amoebozoa
- Class: Myxogastria
- Order: Physarales
- Family: Physaraceae
- Genus: Leocarpus; Link, 1809

= Leocarpus =

Genus of slime moulds

Leocarpus is a genus of slime moulds belonging to the family Physaraceae. The genus has a cosmopolitan distribution.

== Species ==
The following species are recognised in the genus Leocarpus:

- Leocarpus fragilis (Dicks.) Rostaf., 1874
- Leocarpus granulatus Fr.
- Leocarpus melaleucus Gay
- Leocarpus minutus Fr.
- Leocarpus nitens Fr.
