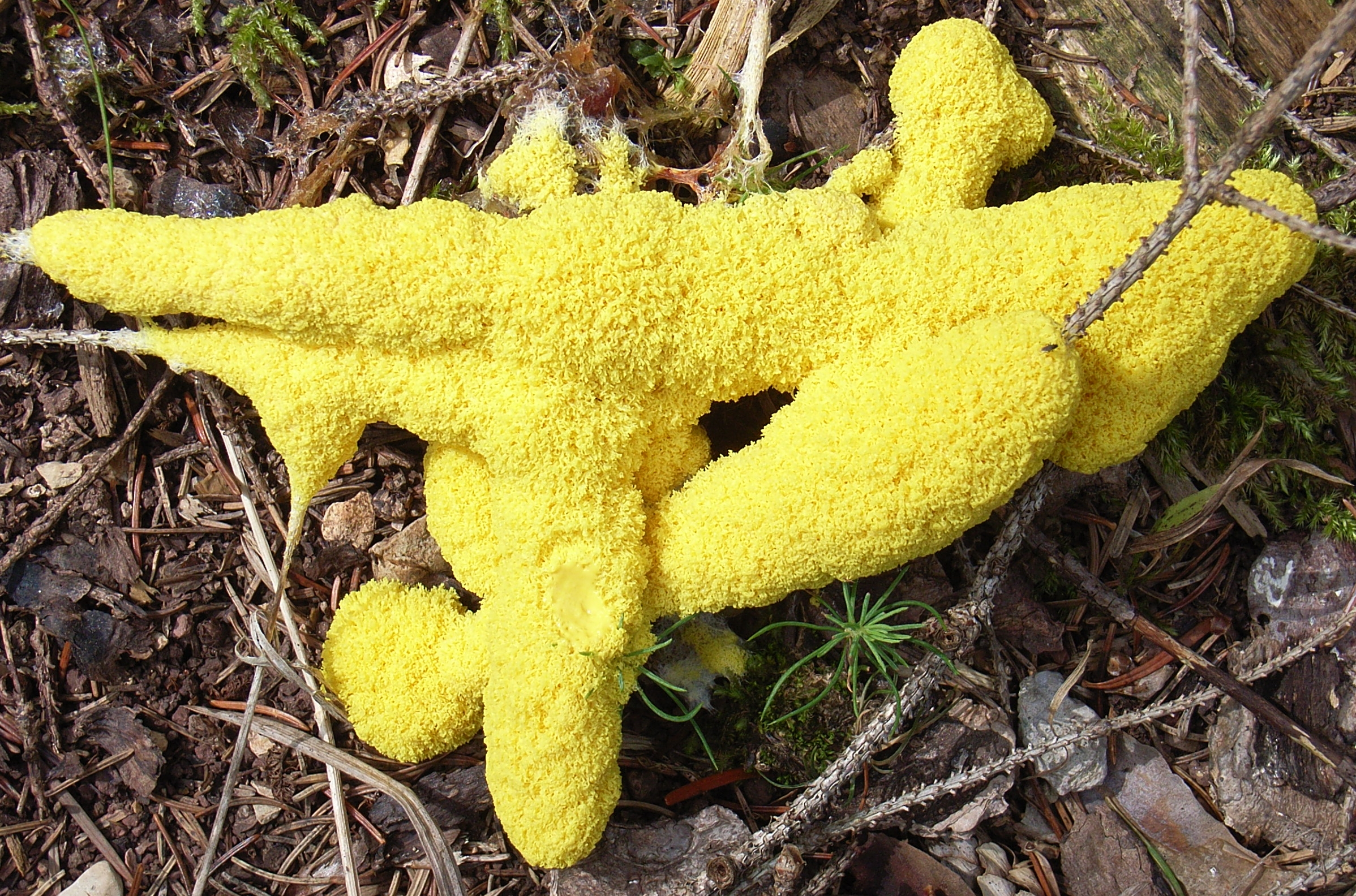
- Fuligo septica

Scientific classification
- Domain: Eukaryota
- Supergroup: Amorphea
- Phylum: Amoebozoa
- Class: Myxogastria
- Order: Physarales
- Family: Physaraceae; Chevall.

= Physaraceae =

Family of slime moulds

Physaraceae is a family of slime molds in the order Physarales.

== Genera ==
The following genera are members of Physaraceae:

- Badhamia
- Craterium
- Fuligo
- Kelleromyxa
- Leocarpus
- Physarella
- Physarina
- Physarum
- Willkommlangea
