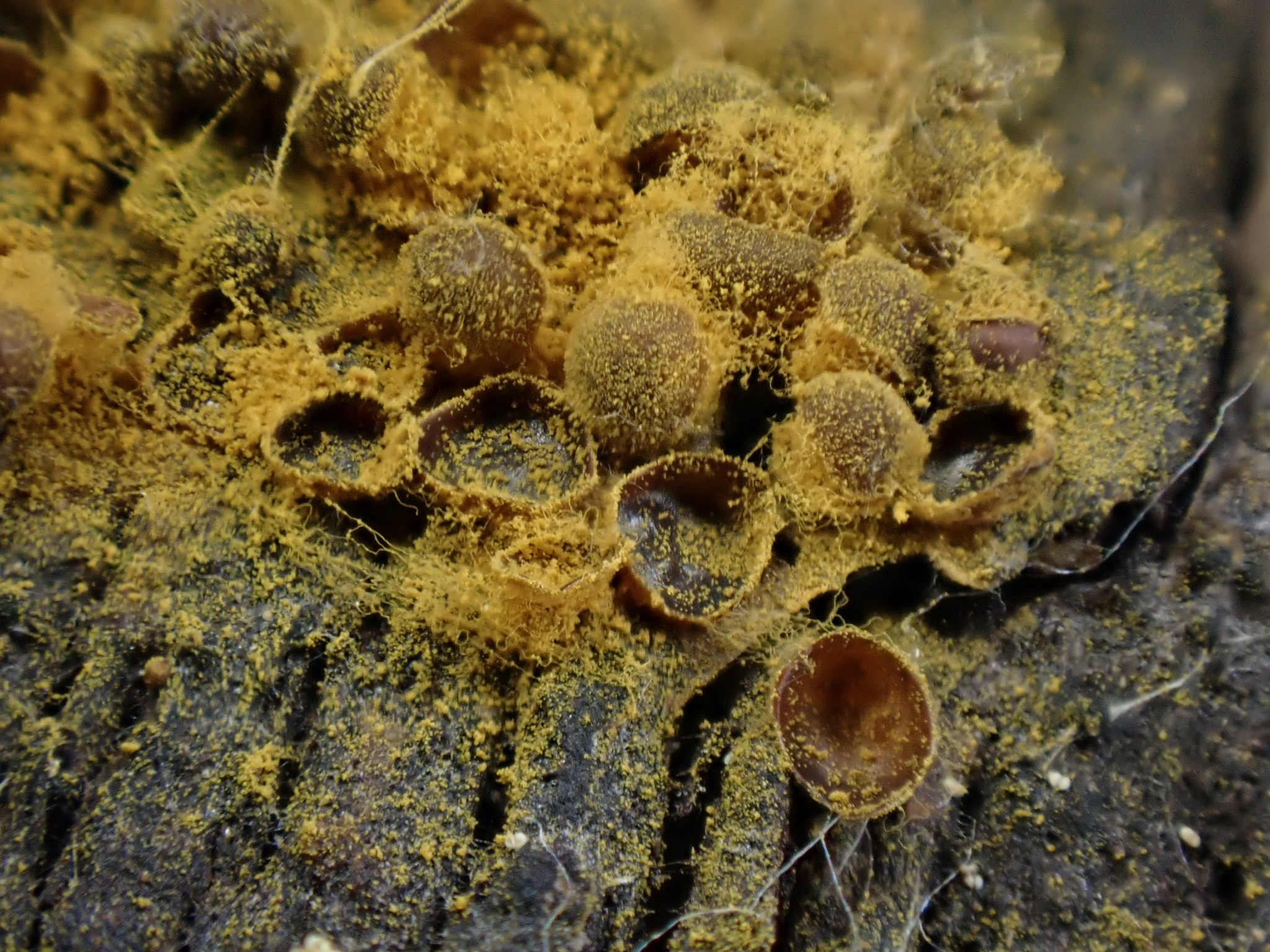
- Perichaena corticalis

Scientific classification
- Domain: Eukaryota
- Phylum: Amoebozoa
- Class: Myxogastria
- Order: Trichiales
- Family: Trichiaceae
- Genus: Perichaena; Fries

Type species
- Perichaena corticalis (Batsch) Rostaf.

Synonyms
- Ophiotheca Curr. (1854); Pyxidium Gray (1821); Stegasma Corda (1842)

= Perichaena =

Genus of myxomycete slime mold

Perichaena is a genus of myxomycete slime mold in the family Trichiaceae containing around 37 described species globally.

== Characteristics ==
The genus is phylogenetically distinct, but difficult to distinguish morphologically from the genera Gulielmina and Ophiotheca, which were separated from Perichaena in recent years. For the purposes of morphological study, the three genera may be referred to collectively as Perichaena sensu lato.

Key characteristics of this group include poorly developed or absent capillitium, which is never ornamented with spiral bands, a fragile and relatively dense peridium, and a golden-yellow or orange spore mass.

Additionally, many of these characteristics are shared with the genus Licea. Thus, none of these traits alone may be used to unambiguisally distinguish the genus Perichaena from all others and must be used in complex.

== Taxonomy ==
In 1922, Thomas Huston Macbride placed the genus in the family Perichaenaceae. Based on morphological characteristics it was moved to the family Trichiaceae in 1969. Research by Nannenga-Bremekamp in 1982 and Lado and Eliasson in 2017 assigned the genus to the family Arcyriaceae. However, recent phylogenetic studies have affirmed its placement within the family Trichiaceae.

In 2015, it was reported that the genus was polyphyletic. Further phylogenetic analysis in 2022 determined that the genus consisted of three distinct clades. This led to the genus being split into three distinct genera, with some species being placed into the new genus Gulielmina García-Cunch., J.C. Zamora & Lado, some being moved to the resurrected genus Ophiotheca Curr., and the majority of species being retained in the established genus Perichaena Fr.. Additionally, the species Trichia agaves, was moved to the genus Perichaena.

== Nomenclature ==
The genus Perichaena was formerly established by the Swedish naturalist Elias Magnus Fries in 1817. It was subsequently reported as Pyxidium by Samuel Frederick Gray in 1821, as Stegasma by August Karl Joseph Corda in 1842, and as Ophiotheca in 1854 by Frederick Currey. These are generally treated as synonyms of the genus Perichaena.

Fries did not designate a type species and so one had to be selected later. The currently recognized type species of the genus is Perichaena corticalis, which was published by Józef Rostafiński in 1875. This species had been described in 1783 by the German naturalist August Batsch who assigned the name Lycoperdon corticale Batch..

== Species ==
The following species are currently recognized in the genus:

- Perichaena acetabulifera Lizárraga
- P. agaves (G. Moreno, Liz´arraga & Illana) García-Cunch., J.C. Zamora & Lado
- P. areolata Rammeloo.
- P. brevifila T.E. Brooks et H.W. Keller
- P. calongei Lado, D. Wrigley et Estrada
- P. corticalis (Batsch) Rostaf.
- P. depressa Lib.
- P. dictyonema Rammeloo.
- P. echinolophospora Novozh. et S.L. Stephenson.
- P. frustrifilaris Q. Wang, Yu Li et J.K. Bai.
- P. grisea Q. Wang, Yu Li et J.K. Bai.
- P. heterobaculata Rammeloo.
- P. heterospinispora Novozh., Zeml., Schnittler et S.L. Stephenson
- P. liceoides Rostaf.
- P. longipes L. M. Walker, Leontyev et S.L. Stephenson.
- P. luteola (Kowalski) Gilert
- P. madagascariensis D. Wrigley, Lado, Estrada et S. L. Stephenson
- P. membranacea Yu Li, Q. Wang et H.Z. Li.
- P. microspora Penz. et Lister.
- P. nigra D. Wrigley, Lado et Estrada
- P. pachyderma D.W. Mitch., G. Moreno et Lizárraga
- P. papulosa C.H. Liu et J.H. Chang
- P. pedata (Lister et G. Lister) G. Lister ex E. Jhan
- P. polygonospora Novozh., Zeml., Schnittler et S.L. Stephenson
- P. poronema Yu Li et H.Z Li
- P. pseudoliceoides Kuhnt et Mar. Meyer
- P. pulcherrima Petch.
- P. quadrata T. Macbr.
- P. reticulospora H.W. Keller et D.R. Reynolds
- P. stipitata Lado, Estrada et D. Wrigley
- P. syncarpon T.E. Brooks
- P. taimyriensis Novozh. et Schnittler
- P. tesselata G. Lister
- P. thindii Nanir.
- P. verrucifera Y. Yamam. et Shuang L. Chen
