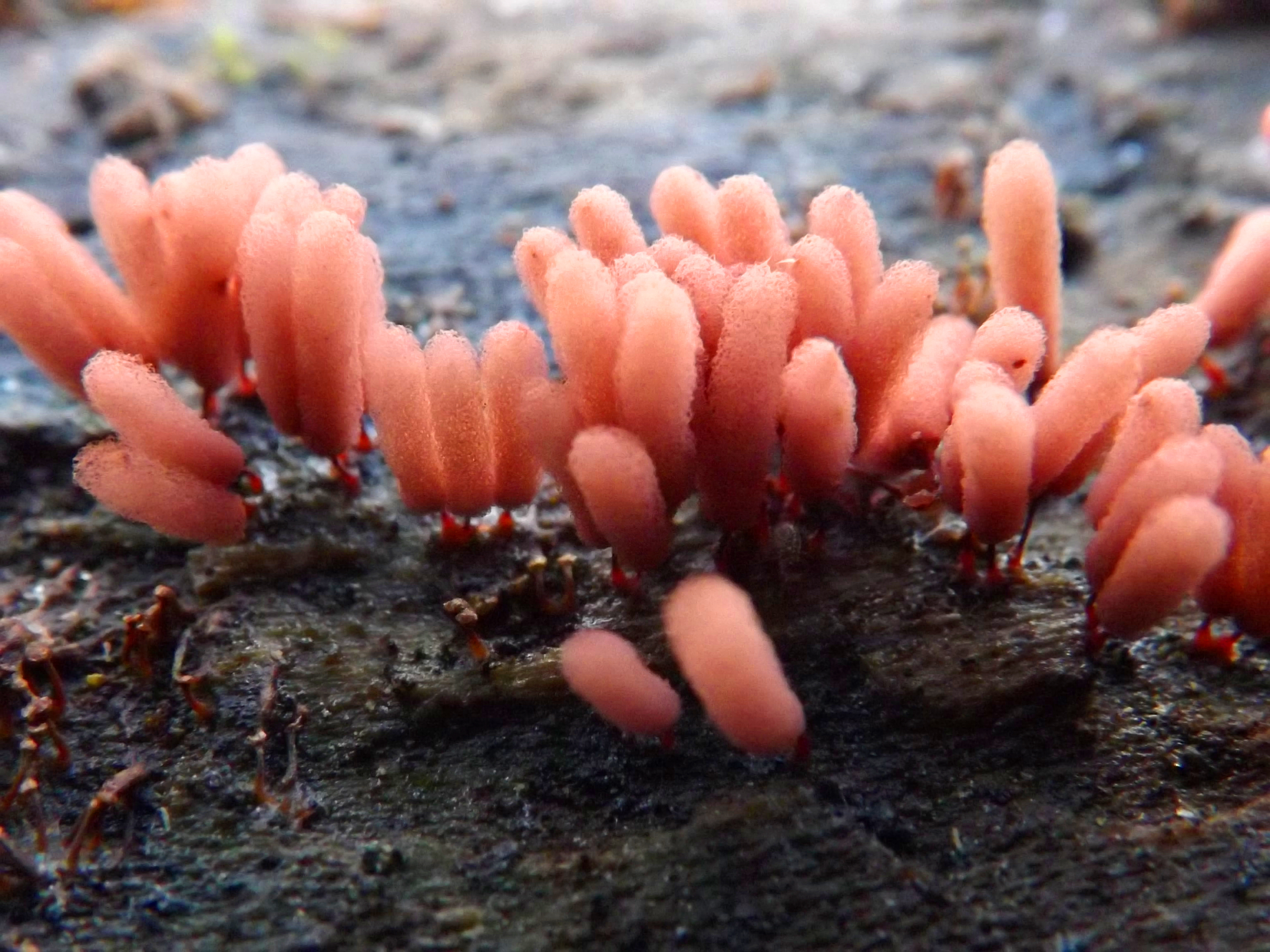

Scientific classification
- Domain: Eukaryota
- Phylum: Amoebozoa
- Class: Myxogastria
- Order: Trichiales
- Family: Arcyriaceae
- Genus: Arcyria
- Species: A. denudata

Binomial name
- Arcyria denudata (Linnaeus) Wettstein

Synonyms
- List: Clathrus denudatus L. (1753); Trichia denudata (L.) Vill. (1789); Stemonitis denudata (L.) Relhan (1820); Mucor clathroides Scop. (1772); Arcyria clathroides (Scop.) F.H. Wigg. (1780); Embolus crocatus Batsch (1786); Stemonitis crocata (Batsch) Willd. (1787); Stemonitis coccinea Roth (1788); Trichia graniformis Hoffm. (1790); Trichia cinnabaris Bull. (1791); Stemonitis crocea J.F. Gmel. (1792); Trichia rufa With. (1792); Arcyria punicea Pers. (1794); Arcyria conjugata Schumach. (1803); Arcyria minor Scwein. (1832); Arcyria vernicosa Rostaf. (1876); Arcyria punicea var. cribroides Raunk. (1890); Arcyria denudata var. globosa Georgev. (1929); Arcyria denudata var. rosea Solacolu & Forstner (1940); Arcyria assamica Agnihothr (1958); Arcyria denudata var. macrodonta Q. Wang & Yu Li (1995)

= Arcyria denudata =

Species of slime mold

Arcyria denudata, commonly known as carnival candy slime mold, is a species of myxomycete slime mold in the family Arcyriaceae. It is one of the most common species of slime molds, and can be found in temperate environments worldwide.

== Description ==
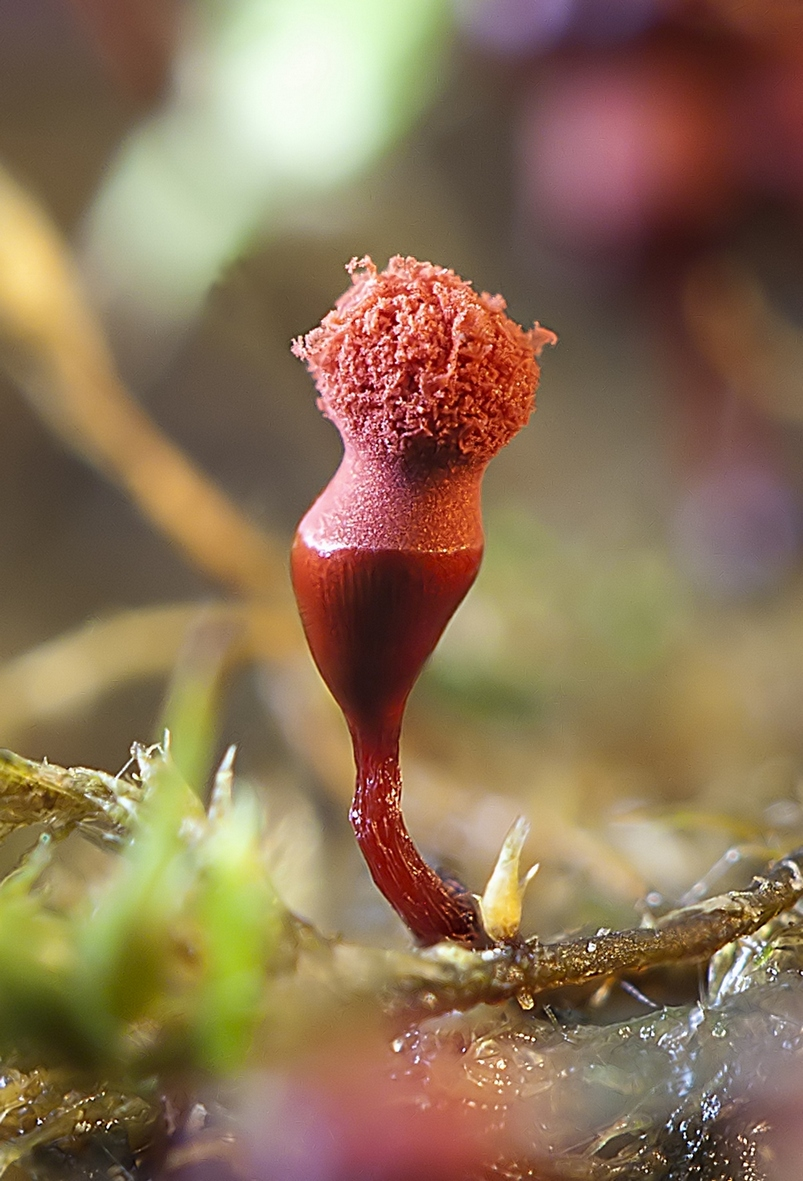
Sporangium with the lower half of the peridium intact and the capitillium bursting from the apex

The plasmodium of A. denudata is white. The sporophores are upright, stalked sporangia that may be gregarious or crowded in large colonies. Each sporangium is ovate to cylindrical, 2-6 mm tall by 0.4-1.2 mm wide, and pinkish-red to brick-red in color, but fading to brown as it matures. The slender stalks are striate, 0.5-1.5 mm long, and may be the same color as the sporangium or darker.

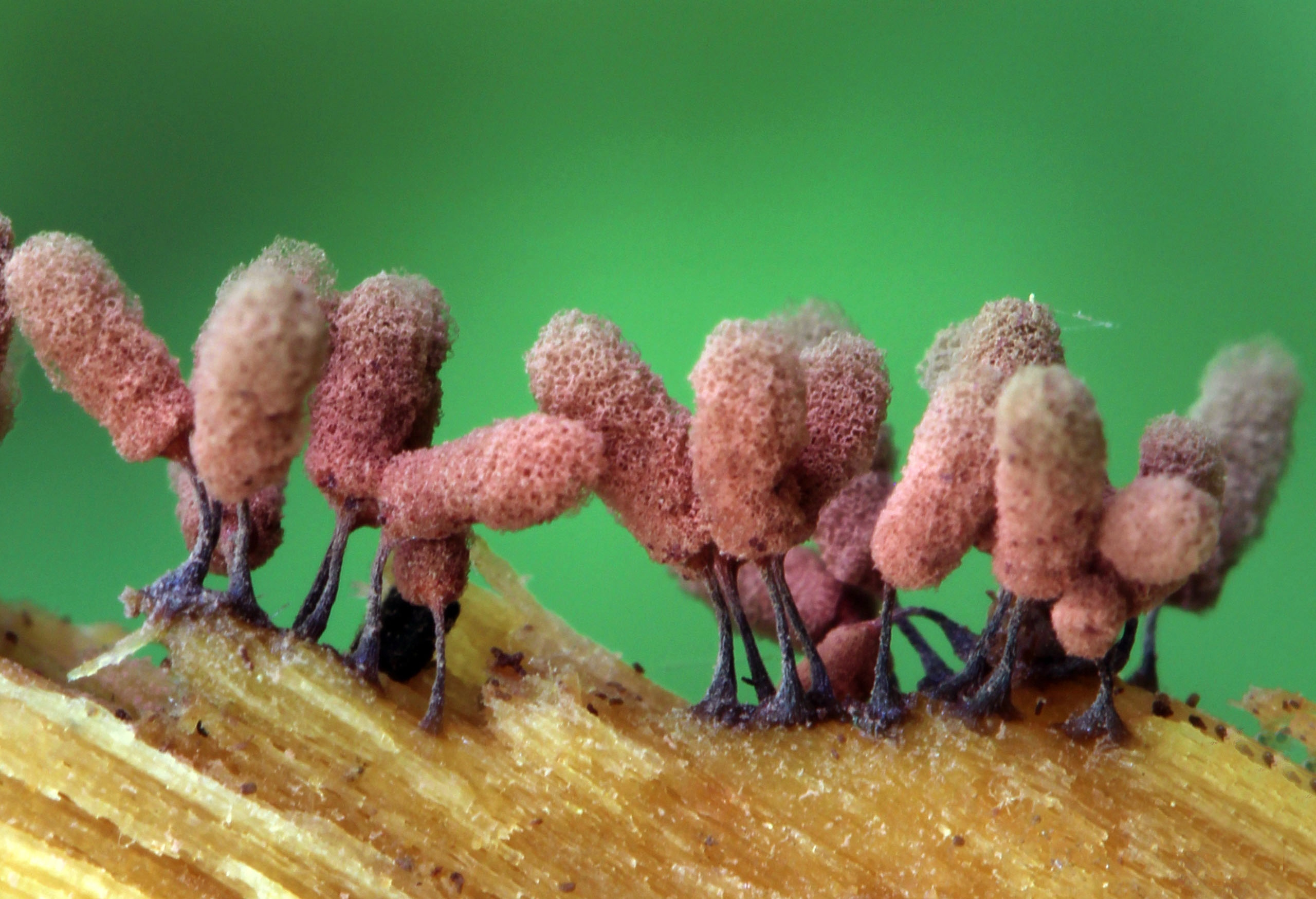
Sporangia with exposed capillitia after the peridia have dehisced

The peridium is membranous, with an inner surface that may be smooth or covered with warts or spines. As the fruiting body matures, the peridium breaks apart along the circumference, sometimes leaving behind a persistent cap at the apex. As the peridium dehisces, the pinkish-red capillitium underneath expands. Without their peridia, the fruiting bodies often resemble cotton candy, leading to the species' common name 'carnival candy slime mold.' The hypothallus is thin and reddish brown with a silvery sheen. The capillitium consists of a network of threads, 3-4 μm thick and marked with cogs, spikes, or half-rings. It is firmly attached to the whole inner surface of the calyculus. The spores are red to reddish brown in mass and pale yellow to colorless individually. Each spore is 6-8 μm in diameter, with a few faint scattered warts.

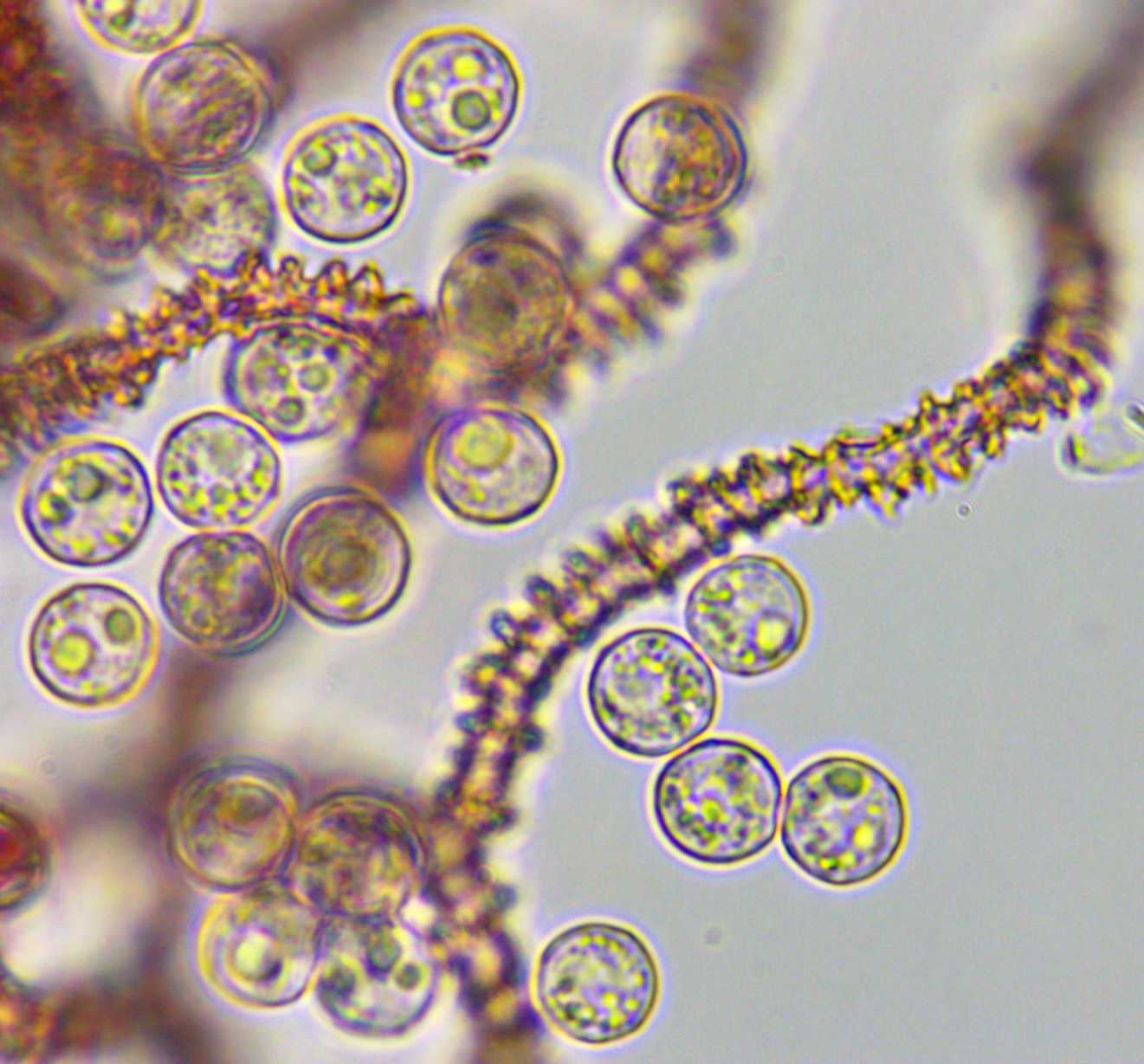
Spores and capillitia

== Life cycle ==
As the outer wall of the sporangium disintegrates, the spores are exposed and dispersed by wind. Insects may also play a role in dispersal. Beetles of the genus Baeocera have been observed on the sporocarps of A. denudata.

When a spore lands on plant material, it may germinate to produce a single-celled zoospore with one or two flagella. The zoospores then disperse locally and subsequently transform into amoeba-like called myxamoebae cells which reproduce by mitosis. These myxamoebae cells congregate into groups called plasmodia, which are often large enough to be seen with the naked eye. The plasmodia are mobile, often migrating in response to light. They derive nutrition by engulfing bacteria, yeasts, and other single-celled organisms. A combination of environmental cues prompts the plasmodium to enter the fructification phase in which it forms fruiting bodies.

== Distribution and habitat ==
A. denudata has a cosmopolitan distribution, being found abundantly in temperate, humid areas on every continent except Antarctica. It is often found growing on decaying logs and stumps, particularly those of hardwood trees.

== Human use ==
A. denudata has reportedly been used medicinally and ceremonially by native peoples of the Amazonian, coastal and Sierra regions of Ecuador. The Amazonian Kichwa peoples refer to it as 'supay ala' (meaning mushroom). It is known to the Secoya peoples as 'ma a'ri teti', meaning 'the red mushroom'. Both communities have used this species medicinally to treat infections.

== Chemistry ==
Many metabolites and other chemicals produced by A. denudata and other myxomycetes are being investigated for potential medical uses. Arcyriaflavin A, a chemical with moderate antibiotic and potential anti-cancer properties, and Arcyroxocin B, a bisindole compound with cytotoxicity against Jurkat cells, were both isolated from samples of A. denudata.

The coloration of the spore mass is the result of various bisindolylmaleimide compounds including red arcyriarubins and arcyroxins, yellow arcyriaflavins, orange arcyroxindoles, and dark green arcyriaverdins. Arcyriarubins are easily oxidatively converted to other compounds of this group, which likely accounts for why the color of the fruiting bodies change from red to brown as they mature.

== Influences in popular culture ==
The only current known influences in modern culture from the fungus is the band "Arcyria", a melodic metalcore band based in Raleigh, North Carolina. The band is also part of the Thirdhell Collective, a multimedia art collective from Raleigh NC.
