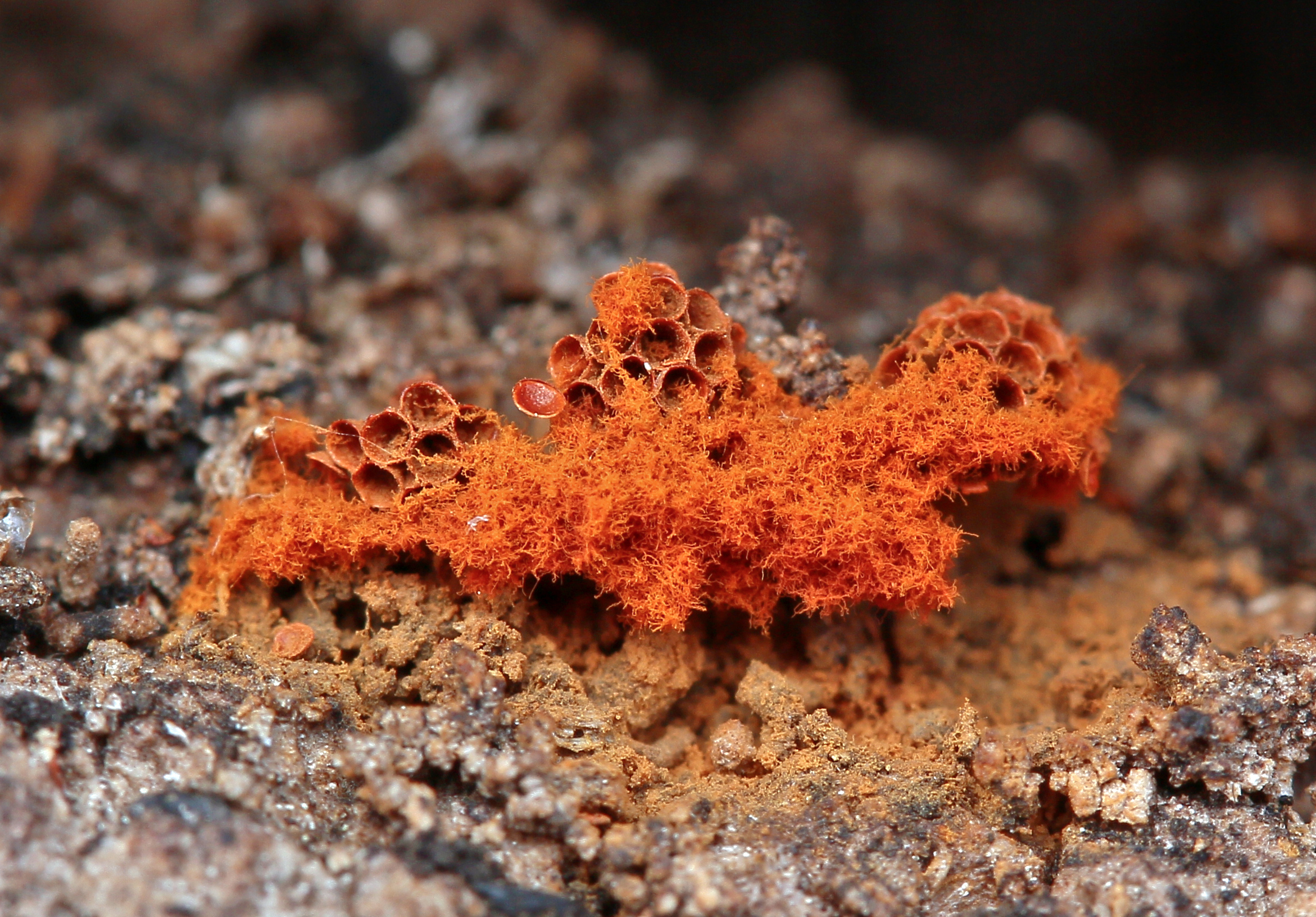
- Empty sporangia with red-orange capillitium

Scientific classification
- Domain: Eukaryota
- Phylum: Amoebozoa
- Class: Myxogastria
- Order: Trichiales
- Family: Trichiaceae
- Genus: Metatrichia
- Species: M. vesparium

Binomial name
- Metatrichia vesparium (Batsch) Nann.-Bremek, 1969

Synonyms
- List: Lycoperdon vesparium Batsch (1786); Stemonitis vesparium (Batsch) J.F. Gmel.(1792); Hemitrichia vesparium (Batsch) T. Macbr. (1899); Mucor pyriformis Leers (1775) nom. illegit. M. pyriformis Scop. (1772); Trichia pyriformis (Leers) Hoffm. (1790) nom. illegit. T. pyriformis Vill. (1789); Stemonitis cinnabarina Roth (1788); Trichia fragiformis With. (1792); Trichia rubiformis Pers. (1794); Hemiarcyria rubiformis (Pers.) Rostaf. (1875); Arcyria rubiformes (Pers.) Massee (1892); Hemitrichia rubiformes (Pers.) Lister (1894); Trichia rubiformis var. minor Pers. (1797); Trichia rubiformes var. laevis Alb. & Schwein. (1805); Trichia chalybea Chevall. (1826); Craterium porphyrium Schwein. (1832); Trichia neesiana Corda (1837); Hemiarcyria rubiformis var. neesiana (Corda) Rostaf. (1875); Hemitrichia vesparium var. neesiana (Corda) Torrend (1907); Trichia ayresii Berk. & Broome (1850); Hemiarcyria rubiformes var. tubulina Rostaf. (1875); Hemiarcyria ellisii Massee (1889)

= Metatrichia vesparium =

Species of slime mold

Metatrichia vesparium, commonly known as wasp's nest slime mold, is a species of myxomycete slime mold in the family Trichiaceae that is widely distributed in the Northern Hemisphere.

== Description ==
The plasmodium of M. vesparium is black, becoming deep red just prior to fruiting.

The sporophores are stalked (or rarely sessile) sporangia that may be gregarious or densely crowded. The sporangia are clustered in groups of up to 12, sharing a united stalk, and sometimes forming a pseudoaethalium. The stalks are brick red in color, fairly thick when supporting multiple sporangia, and 0.2-3.5 mm long. The total height of the fruiting bodies, including the stalk and sporangia may be 1–4.5 mm tall.

The individual sporangia are cylindrical or obovate in shape and 0.5–2 mm long by 0.4-0.7 mm wide. They may be dark red, reddish purple, gray-black, or black in color with a deeply trumpet-shaped calyculus. The peridium is opaque, shining, and often metallic in appearance due to a layer of densely packed calcium-rich shells. It dehisces along a pre-formed dome-shaped operculum at the apex.

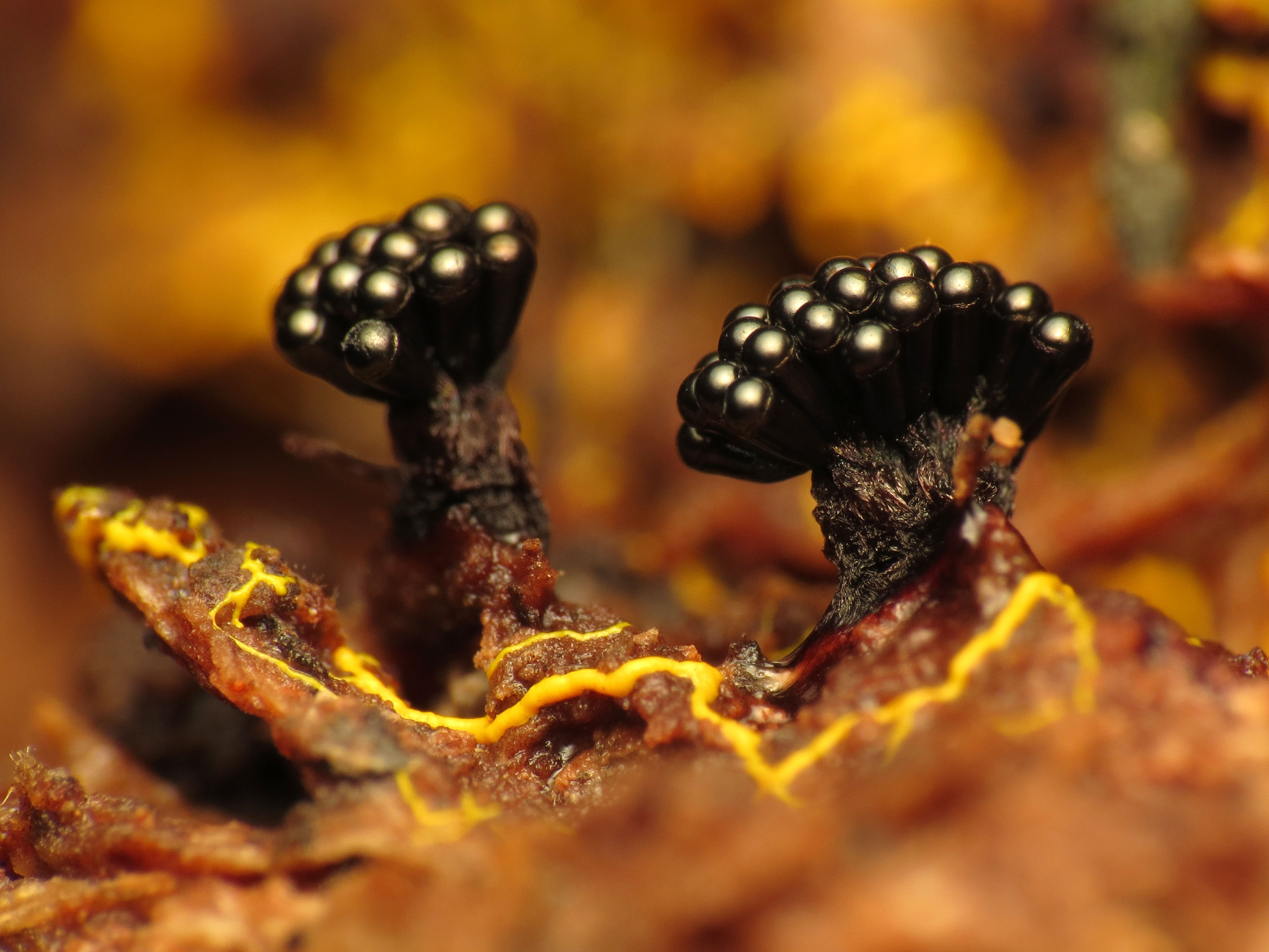
Sporangia with black peridia intact

Once the peridium dehisces, the bright red to orange capillitium expands upward and out. The capillitium consists of numerous long, free, rarely branched elaters, 5-6 μm in diameter, almost all of which are bent 180 degrees in the middle with the two halves coiled around one another. They bear 3-5 spiral bands and numerous spines 1-4 μm long. The tips are blunt, with free ends 10-20 μm long. When the capillitium expands and is dispersed, the clustered calyculi are left behind. These resemble miniature paper wasp nests, leading to the species' common name 'wasp's nest slime mold' and the epithet vesparium meaning 'wasps' nest' in Latin. The spores are brownish red, orange, or scarlet in mass. They are subglobose in shape, 9-14 μm in diameter, and covered with minute warts that are wider at the top.

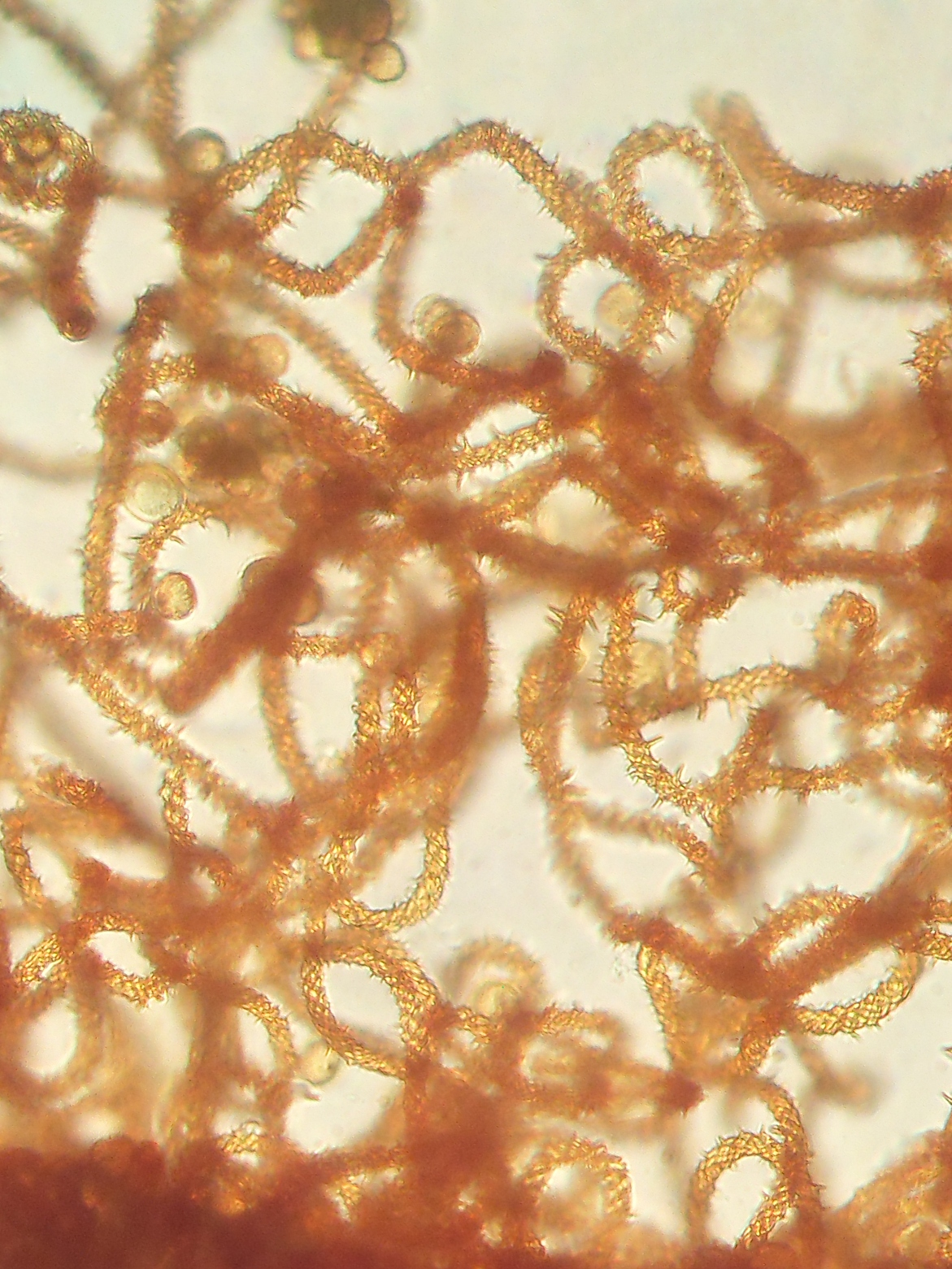
Capillitium and spores

== Distribution and habitat ==
Metatrichia vesparium has a widespread distribution and occurs abundantly in temperate regions of the Northern Hemisphere. It prefers mild, humid environments and is notably less common in the tropics and Southern Hemisphere.

The fruiting bodies can be found growing on decaying wood and bark, mostly of broad-leaved trees, and particularly on Fagus and Ulmus species. They may sometimes be found on dead leaves, but are rarely seen on gymnosperms or bryophytes.

== Chemistry ==
This species produces various chemical compounds of medical interest. Arcyriaflavin C, a compound that is cytotoxic to HeLa cells; homotrichione, an orange anthraquinone pigment with moderate antibiotic properties; and a naphthoquinone with possible antiobiotic properties have all been isolated from specimens of M. vesparium.
