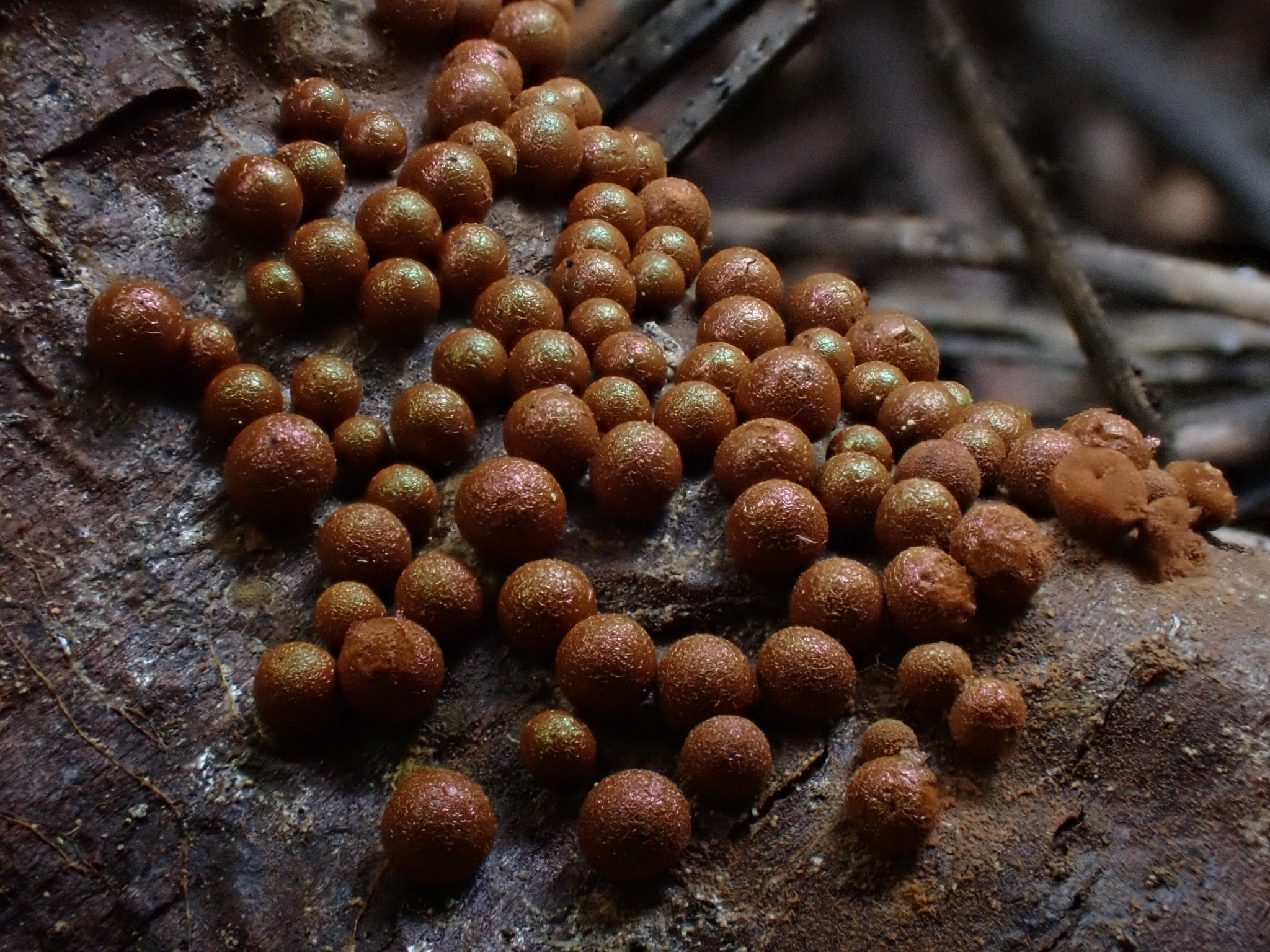

Scientific classification
- Domain: Eukaryota
- Phylum: Amoebozoa
- Class: Myxogastria
- Order: Trichiales
- Family: Trichiaceae
- Genus: Prototrichia Rostaf.
- Species: P. metallica

Binomial name
- Prototrichia metallica (Berk.) Massee

= Prototrichia metallica =

Species of slime mould

Prototrichia metallica is a slime mould species from the order Trichiida and the only species from the genus Prototrichia. It is mainly distributed on mountains.

== Characteristics ==
Prototrichia metallica is a very variable species. The plasmodium is white. The fruit bodies are grouped densely. They are orange brown to dull brown, occasionally pink, short stemmed or are lying on a heavily regenerated edge, rarely plasmodiokarp sporokarps with a diameter from 0.5 to 2.2 mm. The membranous peridium is transparently thin and shinily iridescent-coloured. Its surface is composed of a coarse mesh arrangement of wrinkled lines, along which it later divides into pieces.

The capillitium is often irregular, usually due to the presence of several yellow-brown, translucent spirally banded strands, which divide towards the outer end. The branches are often intertwined spirals, which sometimes form a network. Many of the outer ends are fused with the upper part of the peridium wall. The spirals are occasionally missing. The thorny spores are pink as mass, orange-brown to brown, individually yellow and have a diameter from 10 to 13, rarely up to 15 μm.

== Habitat ==
Prototrichia metallica has been found in mountainous area of Tasmania, Europe, western North America and South America. It was first found in South America in 1976. It is a "nivicol", meaning that it grows on the snow line at the time of snowmelt.

== Classification ==
The species was first described in 1859 as Trichia metallica by Miles Joseph Berkeley and the genus in 1876 by Joszef Tomasz Rostafinski. Prototrichia was for a long time classified in Dianemidae, periodically even as a separate family of Prototrichiaceae. Since the end of the 1960s, it was asserted that this species is part of Trichiidae. Charles Meylan described in 1921 a further species, Prototrichia schroeteri, and the name is usually the synonym. Nowotny, however, believes that it is a separate species.
