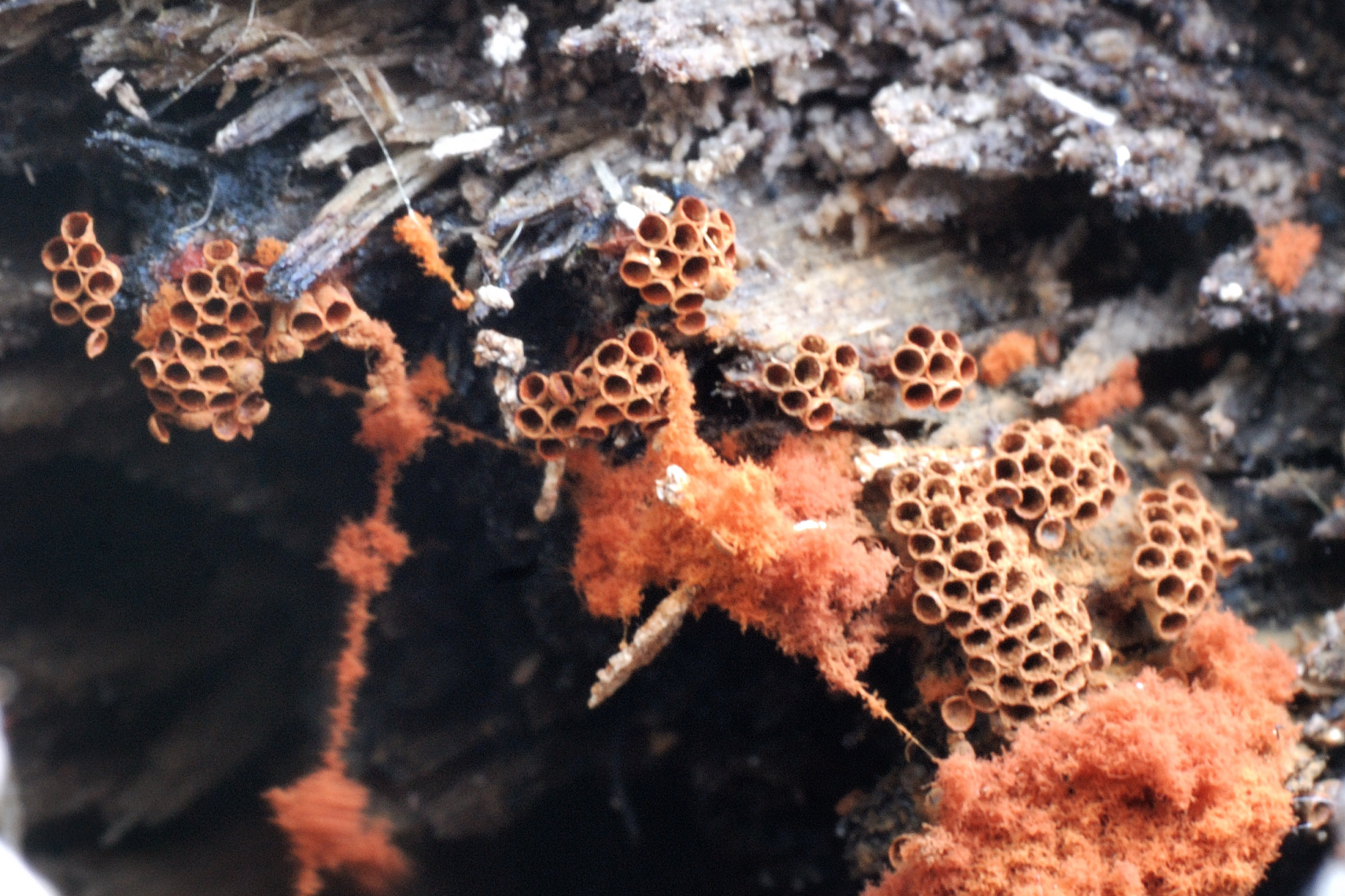
- Metatrichia vesparium

Scientific classification
- Domain: Eukaryota
- Phylum: Amoebozoa
- Class: Myxogastria
- Order: Trichiales
- Family: Trichiaceae
- Genus: Metatrichia; Ing

Type species
- Metatrichia horrida Ing

= Metatrichia (protist) =

Genus of slime mould

Metatrichia is a genus of slime moulds within the family Trichiaceae. Circumscribed in 1964 by Bruce Ing, the genus currently contains six species.

== Species ==
- Metatrichia arundinariae (Rammeloo) T.N.Lakh. & Mukerji (1977)
- Metatrichia floriformis (Schwein.) Nann.-Bremek. (1985)
- Metatrichia floripara (Rammeloo) Rammeloo (1984)
- Metatrichia horrida Ing (1964)
- Metatrichia rosea (Flatau & Nann.-Bremek.) Nann.-Bremek. (1985)
- Metatrichia vesparium (Batsch) Nann.-Bremek. ex G.W.Martin & Alexop. (1969) (Also known as "wasp's nest" slime mold. Formerly classified as part of Hemitrichia, but reclassified as part of Metatrichia.)
