= Oligonema =

Oligonema may refer to:

- Oligonema (protist), a genus of slime mold in the order Trichiales
- A synonym of Grindelia, a plant genus in the family Asteraceae
