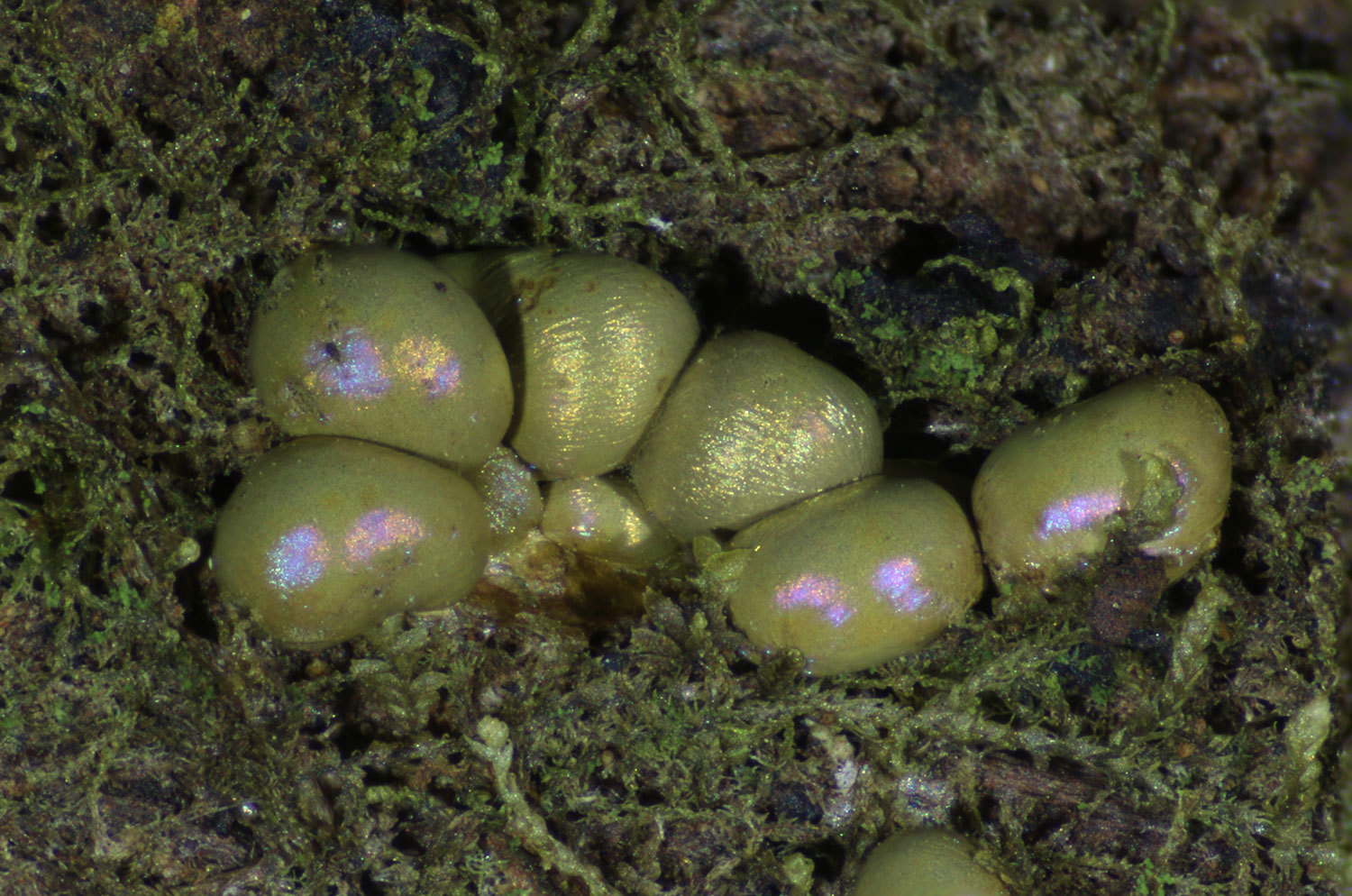
- Calomyxa metallica

Scientific classification
- Domain: Eukaryota
- Clade: Amorphea
- Phylum: Amoebozoa
- Class: Myxogastria
- Order: Trichiales
- Family: Dianemataceae
- Genus: Calomyxa; Nieuwl.

= Calomyxa =

Genus of slime moulds

Calomyxa is a genus of slime molds belonging to the family Dianemataceae. It was first described in 1916 by Fr. Julius Nieuwland

The genus has cosmopolitan distribution.

Species:

- Calomyxa metallica (Berk.) Nieuwl., 1916
- Calomyxa synspora M.L.Farr & Kowalski, 1974
