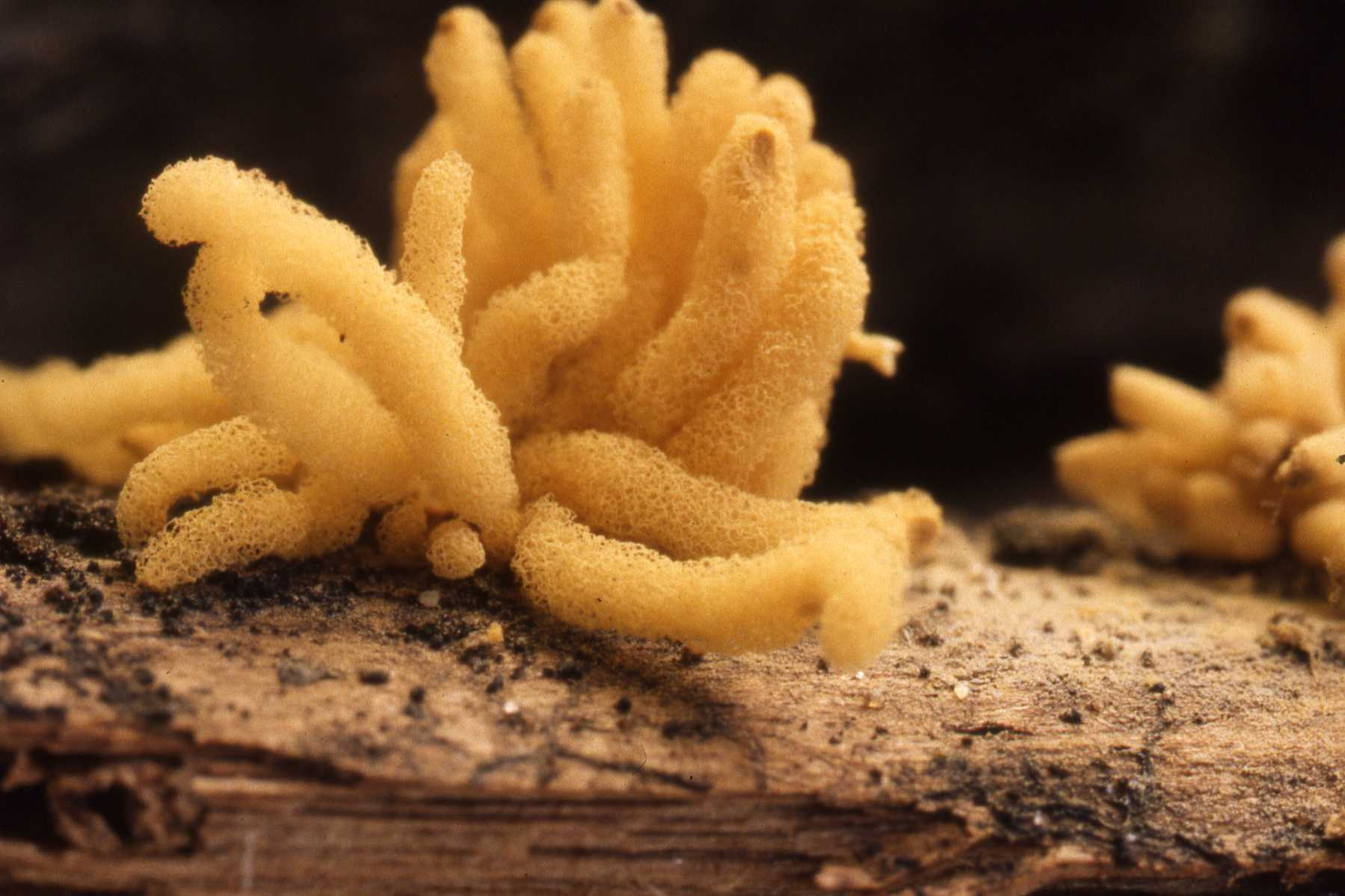
- Arcyria obvelata

Scientific classification
- Domain: Eukaryota
- Phylum: Amoebozoa
- Class: Myxogastria
- Order: Trichiales
- Family: Arcyriaceae
- Genus: Arcyria; Wiggers

= Arcyria =

Genus of slime moulds

Arcyria is a genus of Amoebozoa in the family Arcyriaceae. It includes the species Arcyria ferruginea .

== Species ==
- Arcyria affinis
- Arcyria afroalpina
- Arcyria aggregata
- Arcyria annulifera
- Arcyria aureoglobosa
- Arcyria biniensis
- Arcyria brooksii
- Arcyria bulbosa
- Arcyria cinerea
- Arcyria colloderma
- Arcyria corymbosa
- Arcyria denudata
- Arcyria exigua
- Arcyria fasciculata
- Arcyria ferruginea
- Arcyria flavescens
- Arcyria fuegiana
- Arcyria galericulata
- Arcyria glauca
- Arcyria globosa
- Arcyria gongyloida
- Arcyria helvetica
- Arcyria imperialis
- Arcyria incarnata
- Arcyria insignis
- Arcyria magna
- Arcyria major
- Arcyria marginoundulata
- Arcyria minuta
- Arcyria monticola
- Arcyria nepalensis
- Arcyria nigella
- Arcyria obvelata
- Arcyria occidentalis
- Arcyria oerstedii
- Arcyria oerstedioides
- Arcyria olivaceoglobosa
- Arcyria papilla
- Arcyria pausiaca
- Arcyria poeltii
- Arcyria pomiformis
- Arcyria pseudodenudata
- Arcyria riparia
- Arcyria rubrobrunnea
- Arcyria rufosa
- Arcyria stipata
- Arcyria sulcata
- Arcyria verrucosituba
- Arcyria versicolor
- Arcyria virescens
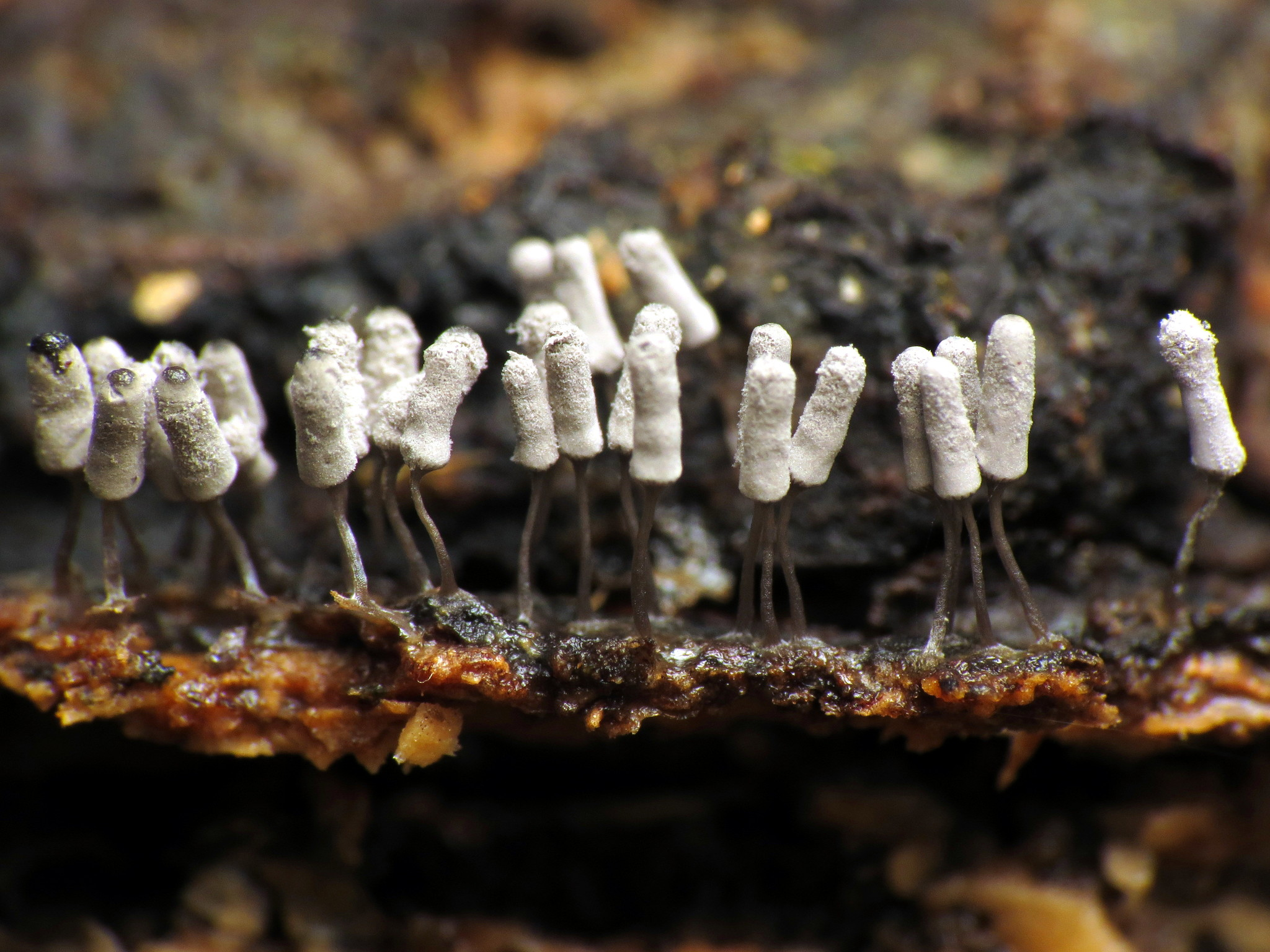
Arcyria cinerea

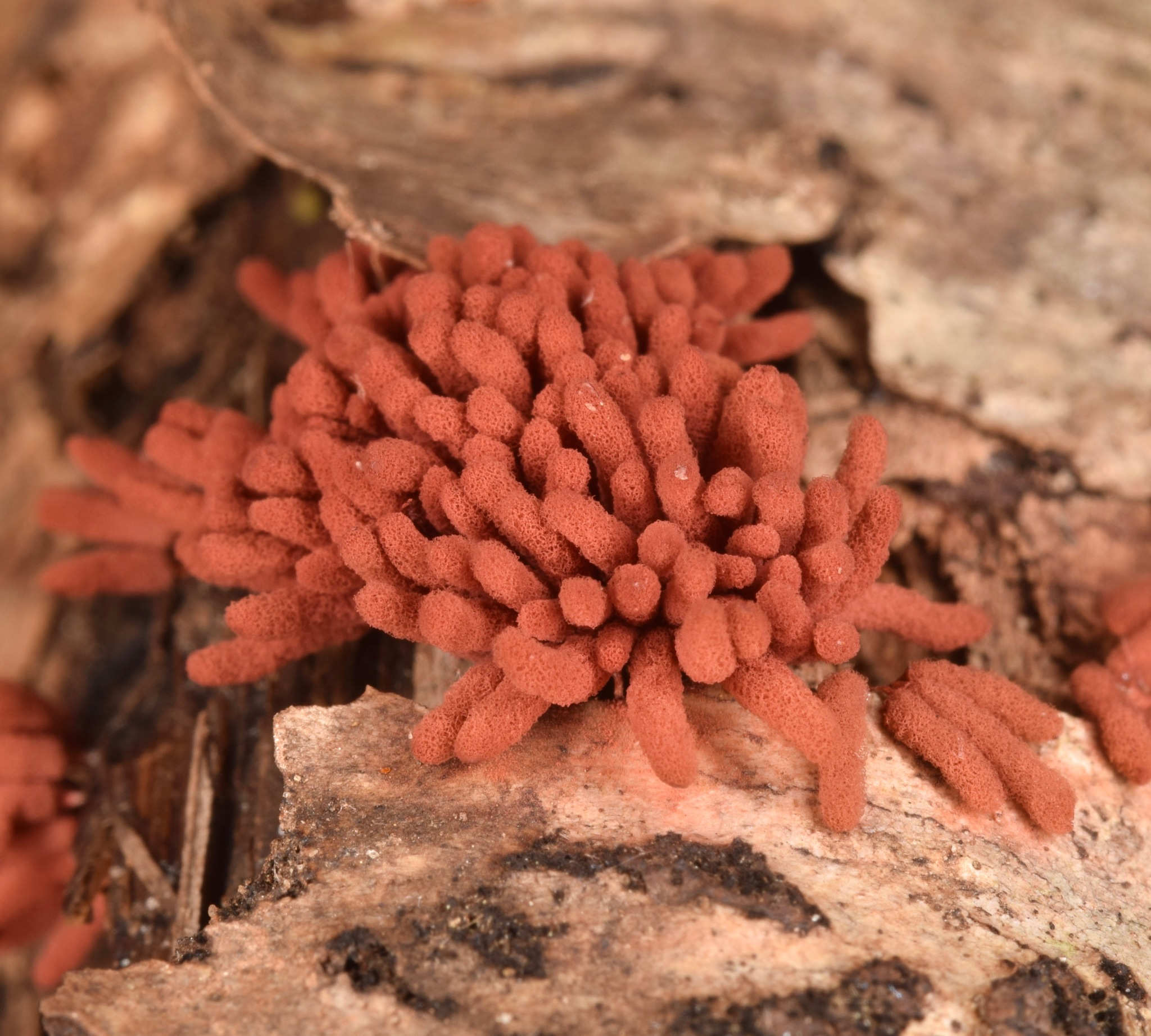
Arcyria denudata

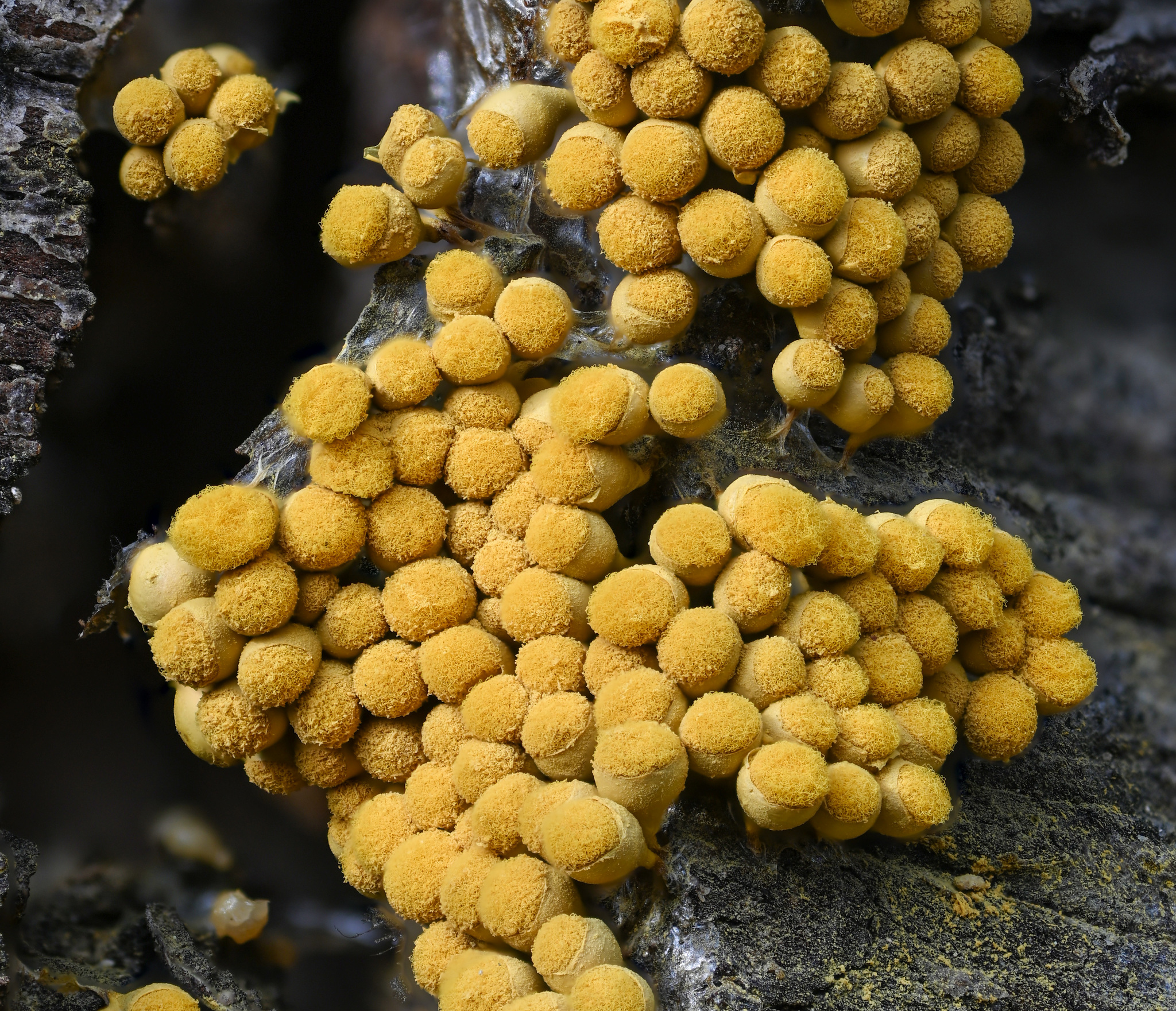
Arcyria versicolor

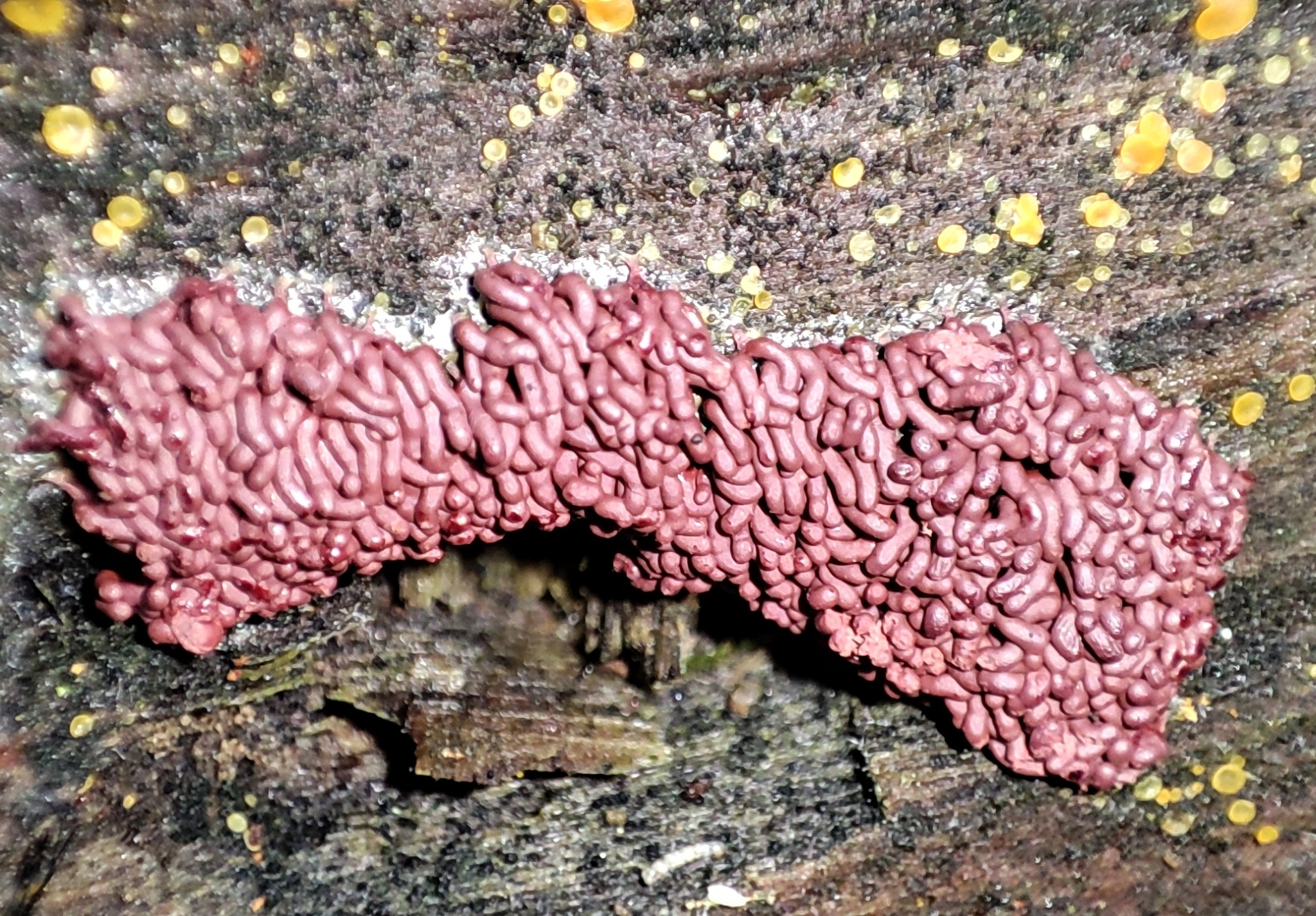
Arcyria stipata

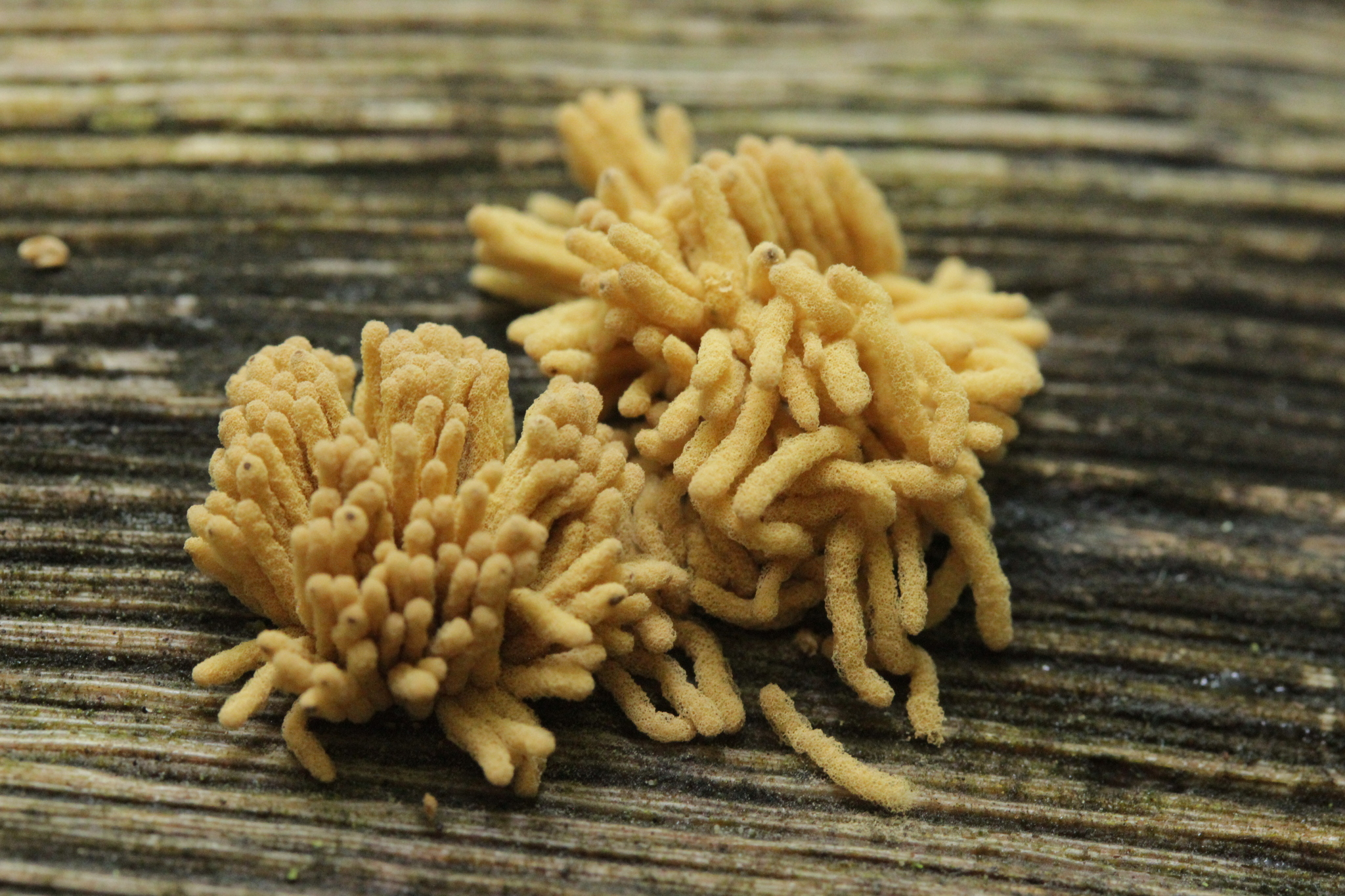
Arcyria obvelata
