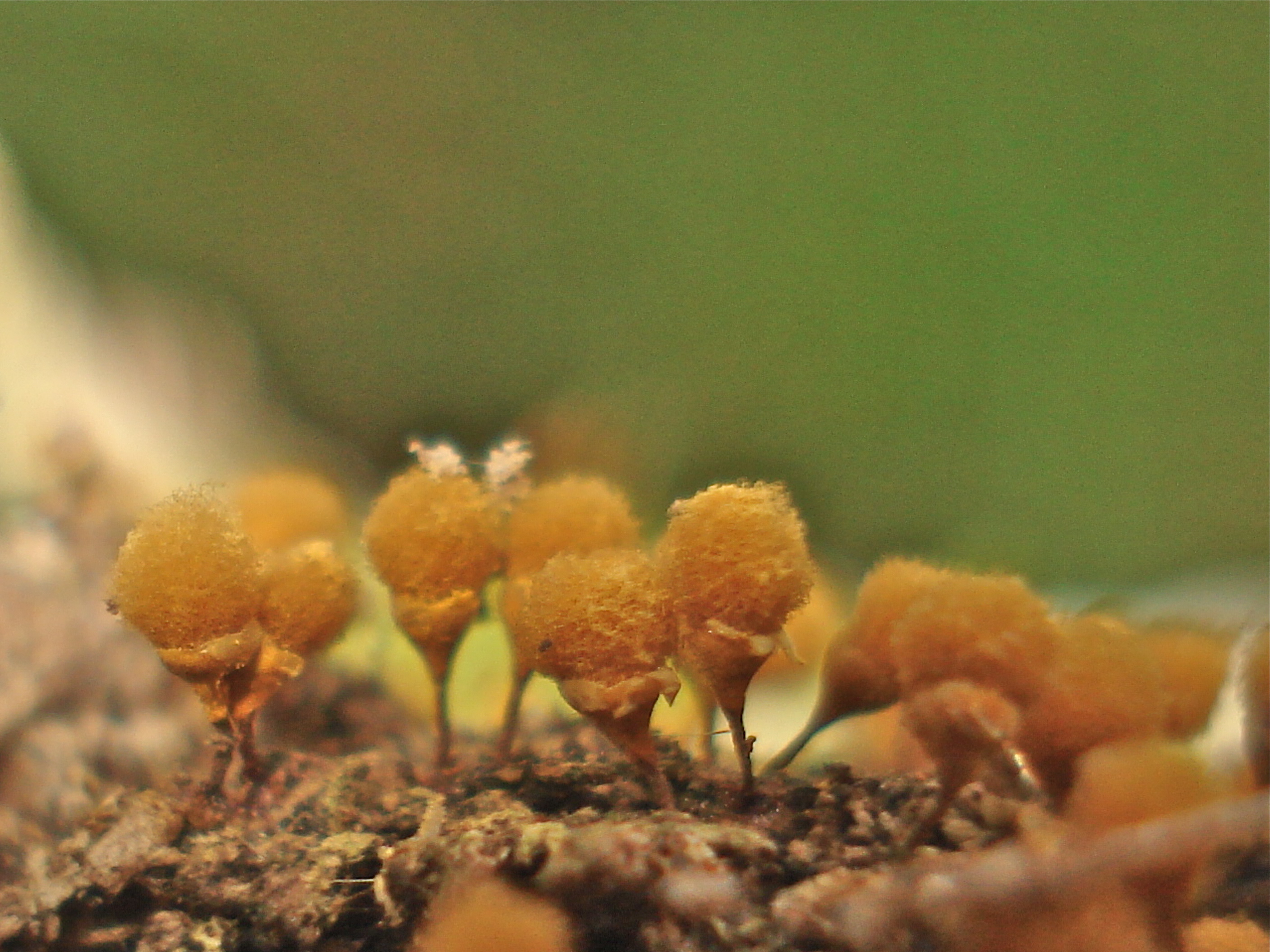
- Hemitrichia calyculata

Scientific classification
- Domain: Eukaryota
- Supergroup: Amorphea
- Phylum: Amoebozoa
- Class: Myxogastria
- Order: Trichiales
- Family: Trichiaceae
- Genus: Hemitrichia; Rostaf.

= Hemitrichia =

Genus of slime moulds

Hemitrichia is a genus of slime molds, of the family Trichiaceae, found within the order Trichiida. It was first described by Josef Rostafinski in 1873 and remains a well-defined genus of the slime molds. Hemitrichia species exhibit either plasmodiocarp or sporangium fruiting bodies, both of which are well-known and recognizable slime molds seen on multiple continents. This genus includes species such as H. serpula (known as the pretzel slime mold) and H. decipiens (known as salmon-eggs), both of which are widespread.

== Etymology ==
Hemi comes directly from the Greek prefix hemi, meaning “half”. Trichia is combination of the Greek trichios, which refers to hair or hair-like structure and –ia, referring to a condition, leading to –trichia being the condition of having hair. Hemitrichia therefore refers to the condition of partially having hair.

Josef Rostafinski described Hemitrichia in the family Trichiaceae, along with another genera Trichia. Trichia was described as having numerous capillitium threads, which are free and tapered at the ends. Hemitrichia is described as having capillitium threads that can either be free or fused into a net.

== History of knowledge ==
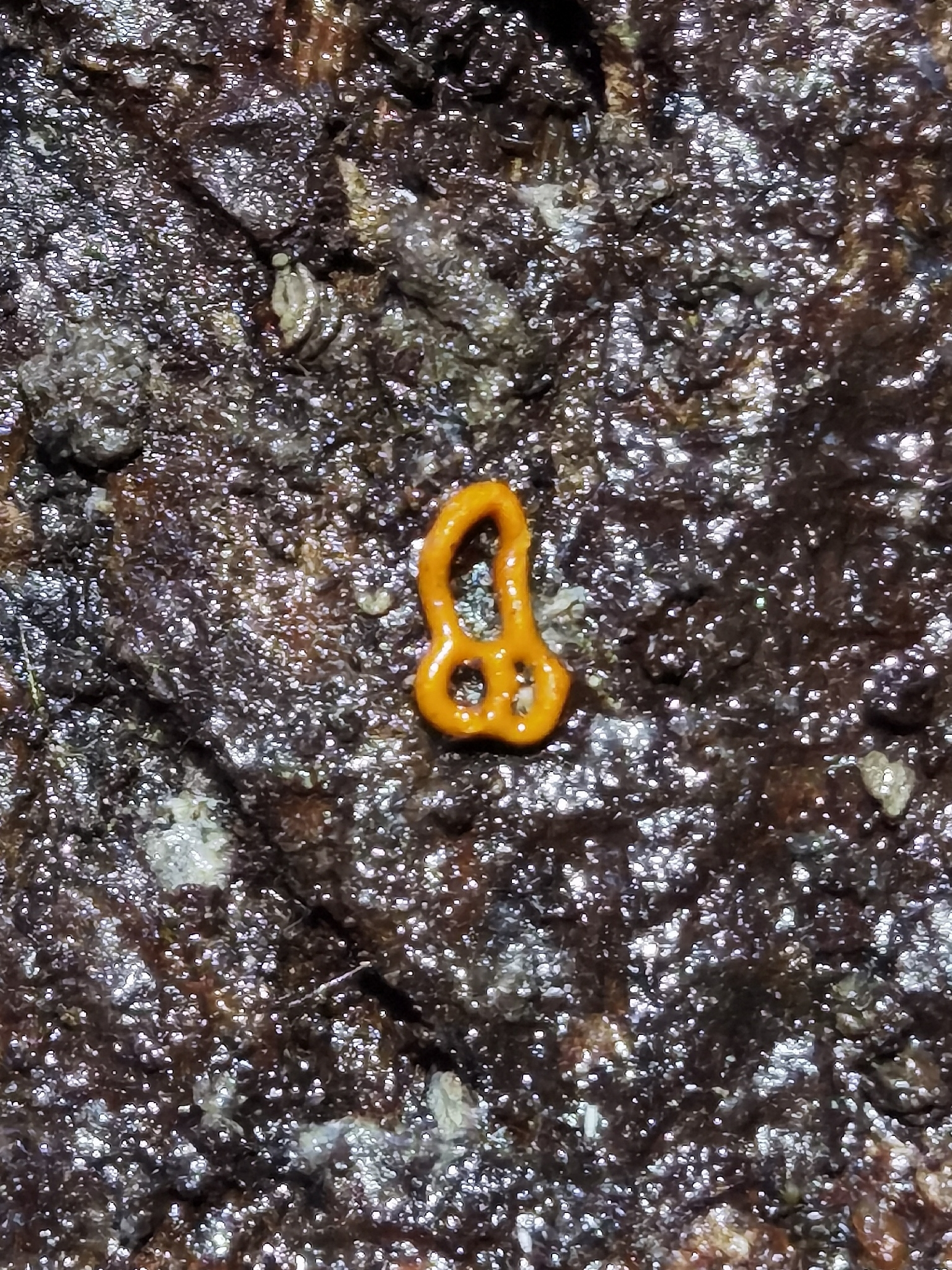
H. serpula, in France

As in all members of the Trichiida order, the structure of the capillitium plays a major role in identifying and defining the different families and genera. The presence of a net-like capillitium is likely the most defining and recognizable feature of the genus Hemitrichia, as it has been mentioned by almost every author in his or her description of the genus. It was first described by Josef Rostafinski in his 1873 book “Versuch eines systems der mycetozoan”. Rostafinski places Hemitrichia as one of two genera under the family “Trichiaceae”, the other being Trichia. Rostafinski describes the genus as having “[c]apillitium tubes fused into nets, free or with single tapered ends trapped between stalk contents”. The genus has also previously been referred to as “Hemiarcyria” by Fries in 1829 and as “Hyporhamma” by Corda in 1854.

In 1922, Thomas MacBride published his second edition of The North American Slime Moulds, the monograph in which he first describes the Trichida order. In this book, the genus Hemitrichia is described as having the “[c]apillitium a tangled net of more or less branching and [cross-connecting] fibres” as well as detail about the capillitium threads, which are “conspicuous spirally winding bands or ridges”. “The Myxomycetes” by G.W Martin and C. Alexpoulous, a monograph considered to be one of the most important and influential works on the plasmodial slime molds, describes the genus as having a capillitium with tube-like threads that are connected into a net, with either free or connected free ends, and decorated with several spiral bands.

Martin and Alexpoulous’ monograph also mentions that the genus includes some species that would also fit well under two other Trichia genera: the Arcyria and Trichia. In MacBride's book, Hemitrichia represents an intermediate between Arcyria and Trichia, and he notes that the presence of the net formation in the capillitium was similar to Arcyria, while the spiral bands are a distinct feature in the Trichia genera.

Currently, Hemitrichia remains a well-studied slime mold genus, with over 40 described species found on multiple continents. Very little molecular research has been done to fully explore the phylogeny and evolution of the slime molds. The majority of the field has relied on morphological features, which often only emphasize the plasmodium life cycle of the organism. Further molecular research into slime mold taxonomy could reveal more information on the family tree and evolution of Hemitrichia.

== Habitat and ecology ==
The majority of Hemitrichia species can be found on rotten or dead logs in lowland forest. Species of Hemitrichia have been found on four major landmasses: Asia, Europe, North America and South America. Of the 26 recognized species, 13 have been found in the Neotropical Region.

== Description ==
Hemitrichia is one of six current genera within the family Trichiaceae within the order Trichiida. Trichiida are endosporous Myxomycetes, meaning their spores are held within an acellular structural wall. They are members of the superorder Lucisporidia, which are the brightly coloured Myxomycetes that lack a feature called the columella, which is an extension of the spore stalk through the structure that holds the spores. Members of the family Trichiaceae are described as having sessile or stalked fruiting bodies, and either hold spores in a plasmodiocarpic or a sporocarpic vessel (see Life cycle). Family members also have tube-like capillitium that are hollow and can have “decorations” such as spirals or spines. In the genus Hemitrichia, these tube-like capillitium threads will form an “elastic net”. These nets will take on the colour of the spores within them, which ranges from yellow to red as is expected in superorder Lucisporidia, or the brightly coloured slime molds.

== Life cycle ==
Members of the Hemitrichia follow the typical plasmodial slime mold life cycle, which exhibits two main stages as well as possible sexual reproduction. Slime molds spend a period of their life cycle as a myxameoba or a swarm cells. These cells are able to exist as either amoeba or flagellates depending on the conditions the cell experiences, and are hence known as amoeboflagellates. The amoeba form is preferred for terrestrial environments, while the swimming ability of flagella is preferred in a wet environment. These amoeboflagellates also contain a single nucleus, which at this stage in the life cycle is haploid. Under adverse conditions, such as a poor environment, overcrowding or the presence of toxins, these cells can encyst into small, walled cysts that can return to the amoeboflagellate form if conditions improve.

The amoeboflagellated stage will undergo sexual reproduction, as two cells fuse to create a diploid cell. This cell will then undergo many rounds of nuclear division without any cellular division, resulting in a rapidly growing, membrane-bound cell with multiple nuclei known as the plasmodium. Fusion with more diploid stage cells, and even with other plasmodium of the same species, will continue to increase the size of the plasmodium. These macroscopic forms of the slime mold are the most well-known and best-studied stage of the life cycle. The plasmodium feeds on bacteria, other microorganisms and can even cannibalize other slime molds. The massive cytoplasm contains multiple nuclei, contractile vacuoles, mitochondria and food vacuoles found on the peripheral edge of the plasmodium. This plasmodium stage usually exists from late spring until early fall.

Plasmodium will then begin to form fruiting bodies, which will hold the haploid spores. The spores will develop within a walled structure, and when they are mature they will be released to disperse through multiple means. Wind has often been cited as the main means of dispersal, but other modes such as sticking to insect legs have been proposed. Hemitrichia species can have two kinds of fruiting bodies. One kind is known as a plasmodiocarp. These are immobile, tube-like veins of fruiting bodies that form a net. The best example of this is Hemitrichia serpula, which forms distinctive gold-yellow networks of tubes that will burst to reveal spores when they are mature. The other kind is the sporangium, which is a round case that holds a mass of spores. An example of this is Hemitrichia clavata, which forms small sporangia held on a stalk that open to reveal brightly red to yellow coloured mature spores. These spores will then disperse and change into the haploid ameoboflagellate stage, starting the process over again.

== Practical importance ==
Two species of Hemitrichia offer important insights into the evolution of the myxomycetes. Hemitrichia serpula is probably one of the most well-known and recognizable slime molds due to its distinct golden yellow net-shaped appearance, which acts as the main morphological feature used to identify the species. H. serpula can be found in lowland forests of most of the major continents, including Asia, Europe, North America and South America, demonstrating their ability to disperse spores upwards of thousands of miles. The species' distinct morphology and its extremely wide spread habitat allowed Hemitrichia serpula to be used to study the process of speciation and gene flow in the Myxomycetes. DNA analysis of H. serpula was able to show that Myxomycetes, like most species, are subject to environmental barriers in gene flow, allowing for the development of new species or clades.

Spores of the species Hemitrichia clavata were found to be viable and able to germinate after 75 years in storage. This demonstrated the hardiness of the spores, as well as providing an explanation for their ability to survive widespread dispersal.

== List of species ==
The genus Hemitrichia currently has 28 accepted species:

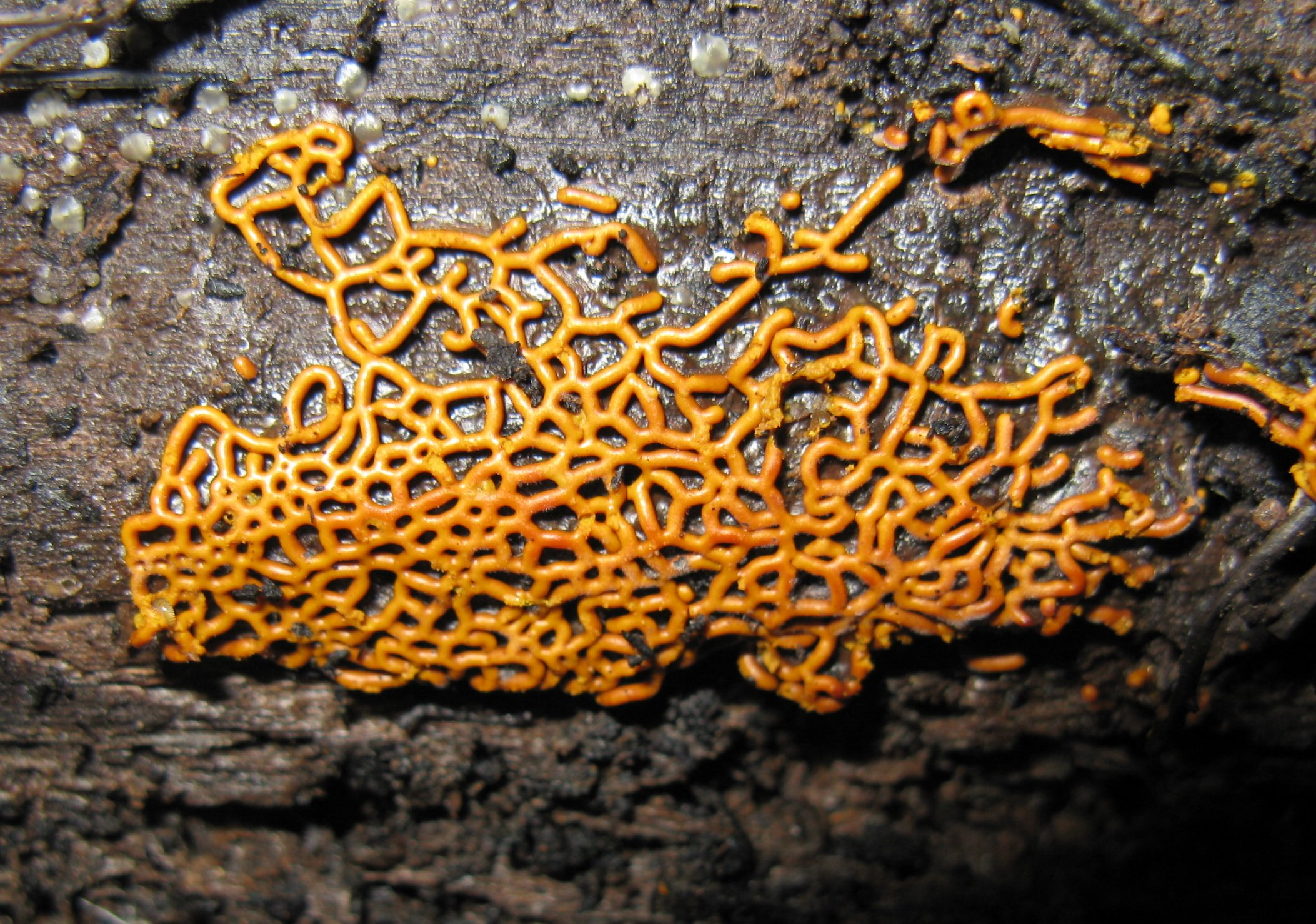
Hemitrichia serpula

- Hemitrichia abietina
- Hemitrichia aurea
- Hemitrichia botrytis
- Hemitrichia calyculata
- Hemitrichia chrysospora
- Hemitrichia clavata
- Hemitrichia cornuvioides
- Hemitrichia heterospora
- Hemitrichia insignis
- Hemitrichia intorta
- Hemitrichia leiocarpa
- Hemitrichia leiotricha
- Hemitrichia mellez
- Hemitrichia minor
- Hemitrichia montana
- Hemitrichia montanoides
- Hemitrichia paragoga
- Hemitrichia pardina
- Hemitrichia parviverrucospora
- Hemitrichia pseudoleiocarpa
- Hemitrichia rubrobrunnea
- Hemitrichia serpula
- Hemitrichia spinifera
- Hemitrichia spinosa
- Hemitrichia succulenticola
- Hemitrichia thindii
- Hemitrichia velutina
- Hemitrichia vesiculosa
