= Józef Rostafiński =

Polish botanist (1850–1928)

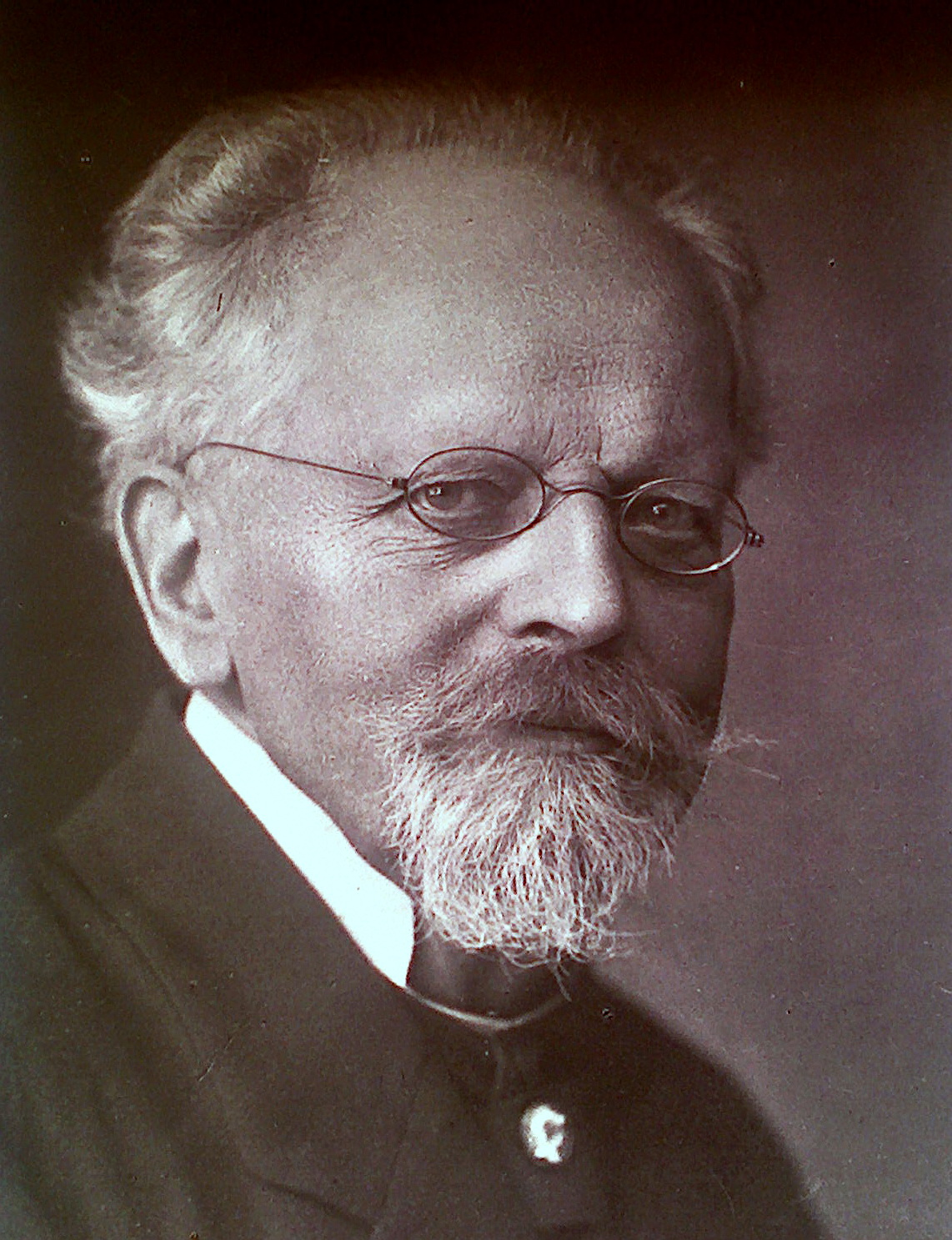
Józef Rostafiński

Józef Tomasz Rostafiński (14 August 1850 – 5 May 1928) was a Polish botanist.

== Life ==
He was born in Warsaw, and studied in Szkoła Główna Warszawska (1866–1869), Jena, Halle, and Strasbourg, where he achieved his PhD before being appointed lecturer at the university of Kraków.

One of his books, the Przewodnik do oznaczania roślin w Polsce dziko rosnących (Guide to Wild Plants in Poland), had 21 editions between 1886 and 1979. In one of his notable works, Józef Rostafiński did extensive research about the Polesie region in eastern Poland, and claimed it lacked certain type of trees due to the soil and ground. Streets bearing his name can be found in the Polish cities of Kraków, Warsaw, and Wrocław.
