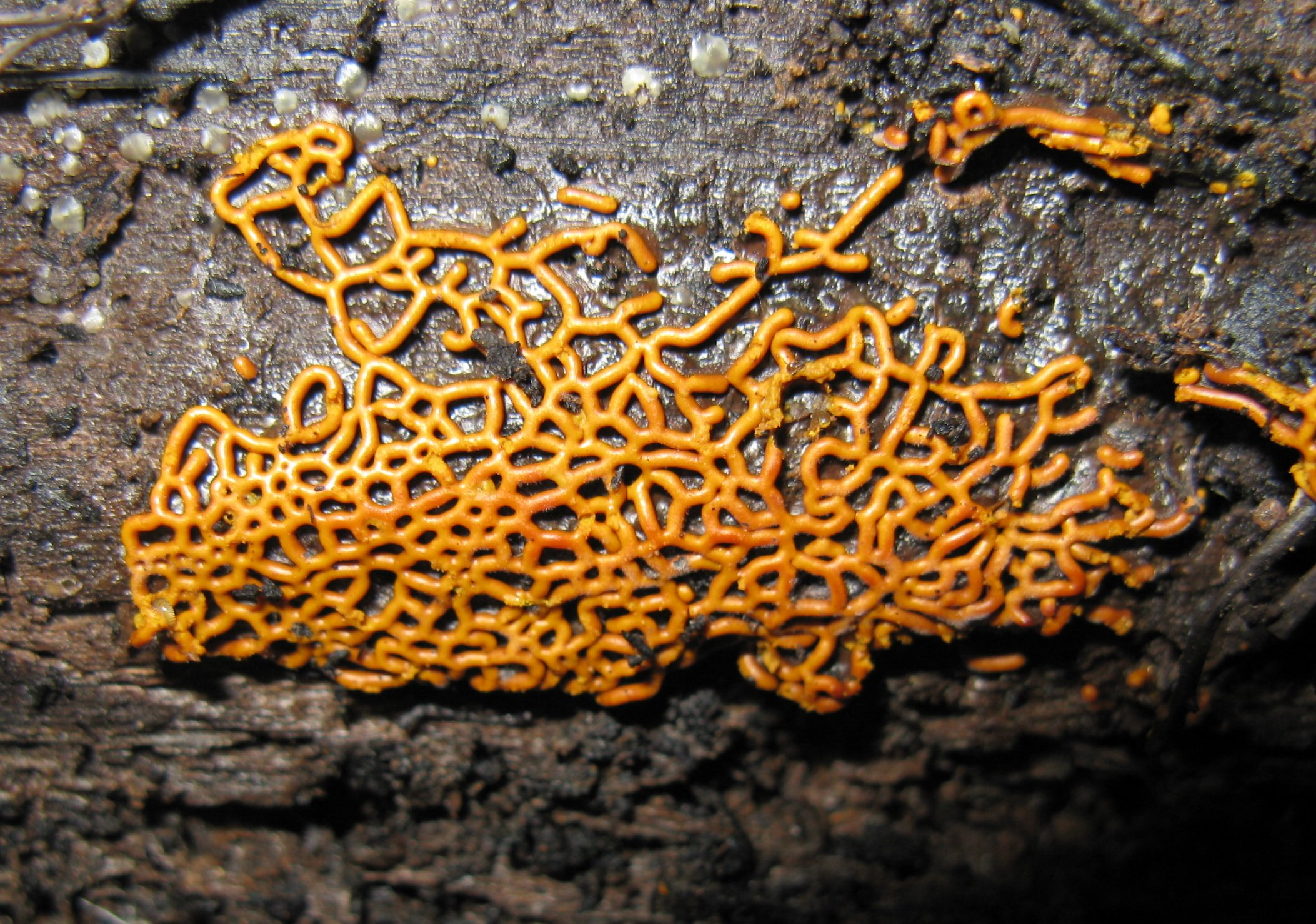
- Hemitrichia serpula

Scientific classification
- Domain: Eukaryota
- Supergroup: Amorphea
- Phylum: Amoebozoa
- Class: Myxogastria
- Order: Trichiales; T.Macbr.

Families
- Arcyriaceae; Dianemataceae; Minakatellidae; Trichiaceae

= Trichiales =

Order of slime moulds

Trichiales (synonymous with Trichiida) is an order of slime moulds in the phylum Amoebozoa. Trichiales is one of five orders in the group Myxomycetes (also called Myxogastria), or the true plasmodial slime molds. It is also currently categorized under the superorder Lucisporidia with its sister group, Liceales. The order was first described by Thomas MacBride in 1922, and has retained the same name and status as a defined order in present phylogeny. In the plasmodium form, members of Trichiales lack a columella but have a well-developed capillitium for spore dispersal. The shape and details of the capillitium are used to define families within the order. Spores are brightly coloured, ranging from clear, white and yellow to pink and red-brown tones. The order currently has 4 families, 14 genera and 174 species. Recent molecular research has shown that while Trichiales probably represents a true taxonomic group, its sister group Liceales is likely paraphyletic, and it has been suggested that several genera from the Liceales should be reclassified under Trichiales instead.

== Etymology ==
"Trichiales" comes from the Greek thrix or trichos, which refers to hair or hair-like structures. The taxonomy of Trichiales relies heavily on its noticeable capillitium threads, which are used to sort members into their respective families. These threads are likely the source of Trichiales's word root and name.

== History of knowledge ==
The Myxomycetes tended to be placed within the kingdom Fungi by many zoologists, despite originally being placed within the group Protista by Ernst Haekel in 1868. In his 1960 publication, G.W Martin described the order “Trichiales” under the Subclass “Myxogastromycetidae” within the Myxomycetes class that he placed within the Fungi kingdom (which he called “Division: Mycota”). It was later determined that the Myxomycetes were much more similar in microscopic morphology and life cycle to the Ameobozoans and since then, the order has been described multiple times as a member of the Myxomycetes within the Ameobozoans.

Thomas H. MacBride first described the order as “Trichiales” in his second edition of The North American Slime Moulds, published in 1922. The main features he uses to categorize the order are a capillitium formed out of distinctive threads, free branching or forming a net, as well as usually having bright yellow spores. Trichiales has also been classified with its sister group Liceales in an order called the Lamprosporales by Lister and Lister in 1925, but the two were separated in subsequent works. MacBride originally used the structure of the capillitium as a morphological marker to create 5 families within the order: Dianemaceae, Perichaenaceae, Arcyriaceae, Prototrichiaceae and Trichiaceae, each given a detailed description of the capillitium threads, which MacBride described as “elaters” in reference to their ability to disperse spores. MacBride's book led to several other publications regarding the morphology and taxonomy of the Myxomycetes. This included The Myxomycetes by G.W. Martin and Constantine Alexopoulos, published in 1969, which has been and still is considered one of the most useful pieces of literature for studying the Myxomycetes. In this monograph, the order of Trichiales has been simplified down to only two families: Dianemaceae and Trichiaceae. Again, these two families are distinguished primarily through differences in the capillitium. The members of Dianemaceae are those that exhibit capillitium threads that are attached to the base or walls of spore and never form a net, while the Trichiaceae are categorized as having capillitium threads that are free or attached to the base of the spore, often in a net formation.

The most recent treatment of the order has four families; however, many researchers have noted that distinguishing these families from each other, as well as the genera, is exceedingly difficult due to the fact that many species have features and morphologies found in more than one family. Molecular research into the order Trichiales itself has only occurred very recently. The first molecular sequencing research done on the Mxyomycetes was performed in 2005 by Anne-Marie Fiore-Donno et al. Before this, all taxonomy was based solely on morphology and development, seen here in Trichiales and the emphasis past researchers placed on the capillitium.

The phylogeny generated by Fiore-Donno supported the close relationship between Trichiales and Liceales as well as other taxonomy predicted by morphology. In more recent research, it has been the delineation between Trichiales and Liceales that has come into discussion. Liceales is a complex order that is not likely monophyletic due to its defining feature being the absence of a capillitium. Further morphological studies have revealed several species within Liceales that may in fact exhibit a capillitium. Many others that have a “pseudocapillitium”, or remnant threads within the spore, which is a poorly defined term as many different kinds of pseudocapillitium have been observed. As a result, suggestions of new kinds of phylogenies based on molecular findings have been proposed. Fiore-Donna proposed the formation of new clades between Trichiales and Liceales to account for the different types of pseudocapillitiums seen. Another possible suggestion has been the break down of the Liceales order into several new clades. This would include the formation of the Trichiod clade, which would contain all the members of the Trichiales order, as well as closely related members of the Liceales order, while the rest of the Liceales order would be split amongst several other newly clades based on molecular data.

== Description of organism ==
Members of Trichiales (and indeed all the orders of the Myxomycetes) follow the typical slime mold lifecycle without much deviation. The Myxomycete life cycle consists of two trophic phases: the smaller, amoebic phase where the organism has a single nucleus and may or may not also have flagellum for motility. The other phase is the macroscopic plasmodium, which arises from the fusion of multiple cells in the amoebic phase. This plasmodium is essentially a single cell with thousands of nuclei, that divide at the same time. The plasmodium can reach sizes up to a meter across and moves through cytoplasmic streaming. Under favorable conditions, the plasmodium is capable of forming fruiting bodies and spores, which will be released and dispersed to grow into the first amoebic phase. Due to the phase being macroscopic, taxonomy of the Myxomycetes has been more heavily influenced by structures and morphology in the plasmodium than the smaller amoeboid stage.

The order Trichiales is considered to be one of the endosporous myxomycetes, meaning that the spores of the organism are produced within fruiting bodies enclosed by a wall. The superorder Lucisporidia, known as the “brightly-spored” or “clear –spored” slime molds lacking a columella, which is an extension of the spore stalk through the structure that holds the spores. It contains the sister groups Trichiales and Liceales. Liceales is characterized by a complete lack of any capillitium (although some members may exhibit a pseudocapillitum) while members of Trichiales always have a capillitium. The genera of Trichiales usually have brightly coloured spore masses, with fruiting bodies that are either fixed and immobile or forming growing stalks. The spores are often yellow but can range anywhere from colourless or white to pink and reddish brown.

The capillitium is the defining feature of the order Trichiales. It is often described as “decorated” or “ornamental” due to features like spirals, warts, and spines. The development of the capillitium in Trichiales is formed through tubular vacuoles within the plasmodium that are organized into the desired shape of the final capillitium, including potential branches and spirals. Proteins then accumulate within these vacuoles, hardening them to form the mature structure.

There have been other morphological features of the capillitium threads that have been used in the past to categorize genera and species of Trichiales. The presence of lime, or calcium carbonate within the capillitium has often been used to discern separate species. Historically, members of Trichiales have not had lime deposits in their capillitium; however, this technique is problematic because lime deposits can be reduced in other species due to environmental conditions. This could result in an incorrect identification. Another method has been to use polarized light to examine minuscule differences in the capillitium threads through the rotation of light, but this method has also been disregarded by researchers.

== Species of interest ==
Several species of Trichiales are considered some of the most common slime molds that can be observed in forests during the growing season. Species of the genera Hemitrichia, Trichia and Arcyria are numerous and easy to locate in forests from spring to late fall. The genus Hemitrichia which contains an extremely beautiful and well-known species called Hemitrichia serpula. It is known for its plasmodial form, which is seen as a distinct golden-yellow network of tubes. Due to its wide spread habitat, Hemitrichia serpula has been used to study the process of speciation and gene flow in the Myxomycetes. Many species of slime molds can be found in lowland forests of most of the major continents, including Asia, Europe, North America and South America, demonstrating their ability to disperse spores upwards of thousands of miles.

== Fossil record ==
Fossil records of Myxomycetes are extremely rare due to the fact that their amoeboid stage do not form fossils and their fruiting bodies in the plasmodial phase are so fragile. A spore of the species Arcyria sulcata within the genus Arcyria was found preserved in amber from the Baltic forests, dating back to the Eocene period (50-35 Myr). This discovery represents only one of two fossils definitively confirmed to be slime molds, and due to the poor representation slime molds have in the fossil record, it represents an important insight into the evolution of the Myxomycetes.

== List of families and genera ==
It currently has 4 families:

- Arcyriidae – The fruiting bodies are either sessile or stalked. The capillitium is tube-shaped and hollow and has features like “warts, spines, cogs, ridges, half-rings, rings or reticulations” (5 genera, 87 species).
1. Acryodes
2. Arcyria
3. Arcyriatella
4. Cornuvia
5. Perichanea
- Dianemidae – The fruiting bodies are either sessile or stalked. The capillitium is thread-like and solid, and appears smooth or textured with fragile and irregular spirals or reticulations (2 genera, 15 species)”.
1. Calomyxa
2. Dianema
- Minakatellidae – “Fruiting bodies sessile. Capillitium tubular, hollow, almost smooth (1 genus, 1 species)”.
1. Minakatella
- Trichiidae – “Fruiting bodies sessile or stalked. The capillitium is tubular, hollow, and ornamented with spiral bands, sometimes combined with spines. This ornamentation is sometimes faint and can appear almost smooth (6 genera, 81 species)”.
1. Calonema
2. Hemitrichia
3. Metatrichia
4. Oligonema
5. Prototrichia
6. Trichia
