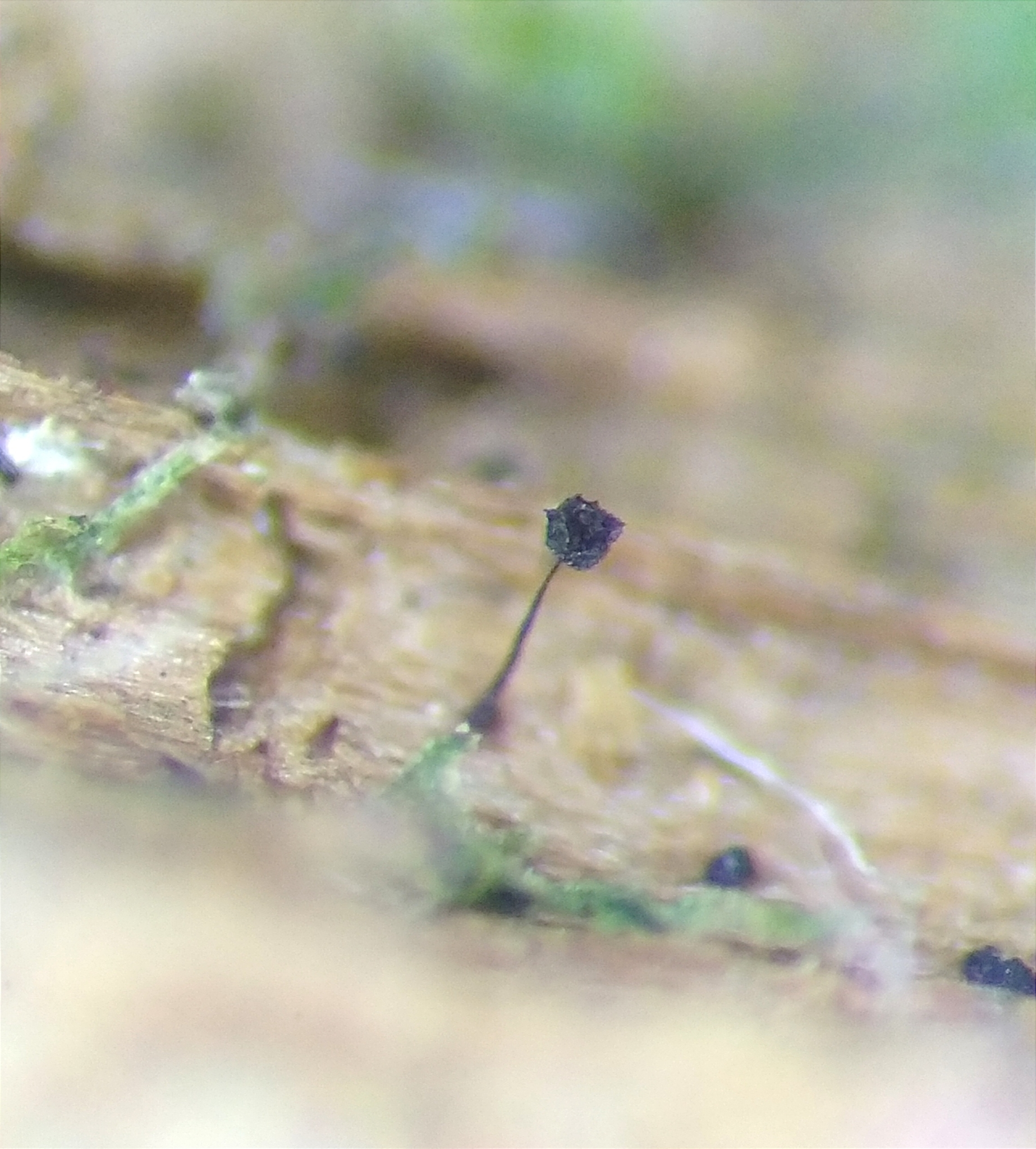

Scientific classification
- Domain: Eukaryota
- Supergroup: Amorphea
- Phylum: Amoebozoa
- Class: Myxogastria
- Order: Echinosteliales
- Family: Clastodermataceae
- Genus: Barbeyella; Meyl. (1914)
- Species: B. minutissima

Binomial name
- Barbeyella minutissima Meyl. (1914)

= Barbeyella minutissima =

Genus of slime moulds

Barbeyella minutissima is a slime mould species of the order Echinosteliales, and the only species of the genus Barbeyella. First described in 1914 from the Jura Mountains, its habitat is mainly montane spruce and spruce-fir forests of the Northern Hemisphere, where it has been recorded from Asia, Europe, and North America. It typically colonises slimy, algae-covered logs that have lost their bark and have been partially to completely covered by liverworts. The sporangia are roughly spherical, up to 0.2 mm in diameter, and supported by a thin stalk up to 0.7 mm tall. After the spores have developed, the walls of the sporangia split open into lobes. The species is one of the smallest members of the Myxogastria and is considered rare.

== Taxonomy and classification ==
The species was first described in 1914 by Charles Meylan on the basis of a collection made at an altitude of 1,400 metres (4,600 ft) from the Swiss Jura in September the year before. Meylan thought the species warranted a new genus based on the unique mode of dehiscence and the makeup of the capillitium. The genus was named for the Swiss botanist William Barbey (1842–1914). It and the genus Clastoderma together make up the family Clastodermataceae. Studies of the development of the sporocarps suggest that Barbeyella occupies a systematic position intermediate between Echinosteliales and the Stemonitales.

== Characteristics ==
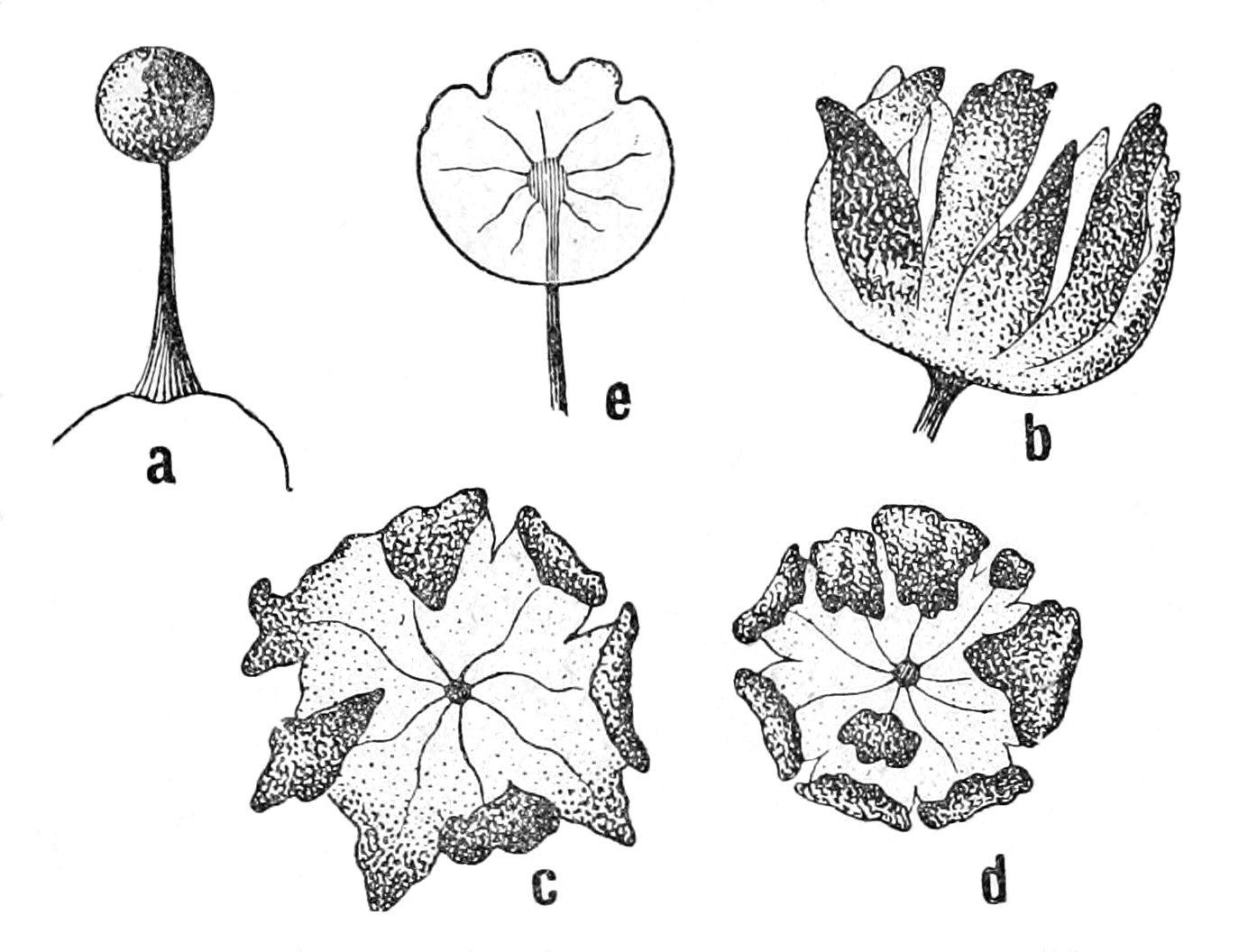
a) sporangium b) through e) open sporangium b) from the side; c) and d) from above e) transparent peridium

The protoplasmodium, a microscopic, undifferentiated granular mass with a slime sheath, is transparent and colourless. A single sporangiophore (the fruiting structure) is produced from the semispherical protoplasmodium, which is approximately one and a half times the diameter of mature sporangia. It acquires dark spots as it matures and the centre of the protoplasm later becomes dark. Then, the transparent and milk-white protoplasmodium climbs along the stem to the top, where first the capillitium and peridium and finally the spores are produced. At room temperature, this process lasts roughly one day.

The long-stemmed, blackish-brown or blackish-purple, barely glossy sporangia of Barbeyella are spherical, 0.15 to 0.2 mm in diameter, with a stem 0.3 to 0.7 mm long. They are usually scattered on the substrate, but also often grouped in loose, large colonies. The hypothallus (the tissue upon which the sporangiophore rests) has a diameter of at least 0.7 mm. Although not visible on mosses, it has a reddish-brown color when growing on wood. The brownish-black stem is up to 0.1 mm thick, thinning to 5 μm towards the top and is filled with protoplasmatic scrap material. The columella – arising from the stem tip – matures at the upper end at roughly half the height of the sporangiophore into 7 to 13 simple or occasionally bifurcated, 1 to 4 μm large, dark-brown capillitium strands. Usually individual, occasionally in pairs, these are firmly fused with the lobed segments of the peridium, which are round in cross-section. When the spores mature, the peridium splits from the top towards the base. This prevents the lobes of the peridium from detaching and provides spore dispersal over a longer period, similar to a dehiscing capsule. The peridium bears plasmatic granules towards the top, which diminish increasingly towards the base. Depending on the size of the plasmatic granules, the sporangia appear papillate or smooth.

The mass of spores is blackish brown, or brown if viewed under transmitted light. The surface texture ranges from almost smooth to warty, and the spores measure 7–9 μm in diameter. Material collected from Oregon, however, varies from European material in several ways: the fruit body is brown; the branching of the capillitium from the columella differs (having primary and secondary branches instead of radiating branches from an expanded tip); the spore mass is tan, and individual spores measure 10–12 μm.

== Habitat and distribution ==
Barbeyella minutissima is considered rare. Its habitat corresponds to the mountainous spruce-fir forests of the Northern Hemisphere, where it is most common. It is largely restricted to altitudes between 500 and 2,500 metres (1,600 and 8,200 ft), occasionally appearing as low as sea level and as high as 3,500 metres (11,500 ft). It has been found in Europe (Finland, Germany, Switzerland, Poland, Romania, Latvia, and Russia), in west and east North America (Washington, Oregon, California, and Mexico; North and South Carolina and Virginia), in the Indian Himalayas as well as in Japan. It is relatively common in fir forests on high-altitude Mexican volcanoes, suggesting that air-borne spore dispersal is effective.

== Ecology ==
The species usually grows on slightly to heavily rotten and barkless deadwood in coniferous forests in cool, moist areas. The wood is about 40 to 100% overgrown with Marchantiophyta, especially of the genera Nowellia or Cephalozia. B. minutissima has been found growing on the liverwort Lepidozia reptans, although Nowellia curvifolia is the main indicator for the slime mould. In addition to liverworts, Barbeyella is found socialised with monocellular algae. It is assumed that the protoplasmodium phagocytises either the algae or the bacteria on their surface. Other Myxogastria species are often found together with Barbeyella, especially Lepidoderma tigrinum, Lamproderma columbinum and Colloderma oculatum. Aphanocladium album is a myxomyceticolous fungus (i.e., living on or within the fruit bodies of myxomycetes) that has been reported growing on specimens of B. minutissima collected from North Carolina.
