= Haesselia roraimensis =

Conservation status
- Vulnerable (IUCN 2.3)

Scientific classification
- Kingdom: Plantae
- Division: Marchantiophyta
- Class: Jungermanniopsida
- Order: Lophoziales
- Family: Cephaloziaceae
- Genus: Haesselia
- Species: H. roraimensis

Binomial name
- Haesselia roraimensis Grolle & Gradst.

Species of liverwort

Haesselia roraimensis is a species of liverwort in the family Cephaloziaceae. It is endemic to Guyana. Its natural habitat is on rotten logs in periodically flooded riverine forest from 550–1,550 m (1,800–5,090 ft) elevation, in the humid submontane tropical 'mossy' forests on the slopes of Mount Roraima, where the borders of Brazil, Venezuela, and Guyana meet.

== Taxonomy ==
Haesselia roraimensis was discovered in early 1985 during an international botanical expedition to Guyana organised by the Institute of Systematic Botany, Utrecht. Robbert Gradstein encountered the species at the northern foot of Mount Roraima (after which the species is named) and, together with Riclef Grolle, subsequently described it as both a new species and a new genus. H. roraimensis is the type species of the genus Haesselia, which was initially described as a monotypic genus.

The holotype specimen (Gradstein 5100) was collected by Gradstein on 13 February 1985 at an elevation of 700 m (2,300 ft) on the north slope of Mount Roraima. The holotype is housed at JE (Friedrich-Schiller-Universität, Jena), with isotypes distributed to numerous herbaria. The genus name Haesselia honours Dr Gabriela G. Hassel de Menendez of Buenos Aires, in recognition of her contributions to hepaticology (the study of liverworts) and her role in establishing high standards for liverwort research in Latin America.

The genus is classified within the family Cephaloziaceae, specifically in the subfamily Trabacelluloideae alongside two other Neotropical genera, Fuscocephaloziopsis and Trabacellula. These three genera share several characteristics including brownish pigmentation, convex leaves, large thin-walled leaf cells without trigones, and the absence of underleaves. However, Haesselia is distinguished from its relatives by various features including its ascending growth habit, dentate ventral leaf margins, and distinctive perianth structure.

== Description ==
Haesselia roraimensis is a brownish, glossy liverwort that forms loose mats. The plant grows in an ascending manner, reaching 2–3 cm (0.79–1.18 in) in length and about 2.5–3.0 cm (0.98–1.18 in) in width. Its overall appearance resembles plants in the genus Plagiochila. The stems are relatively thick (500–600 μm (0.50–0.60 mm) in diameter) and have a cartilage-like toughness. They are light brown to slightly reddish-brown in colour. The stem's internal structure consists of an outer layer of thin-walled cells (the cortex) surrounding an inner core (the medulla) of strongly thick-walled cells.

The leaves are arranged alternately along the stem in an overlapping pattern. They spread outward at a 45-degree angle and are distinctly asymmetric. The upper (dorsal) half of each leaf is almost horizontal and slightly curved, while the lower (ventral) half curves more strongly downward. When flattened, the leaves have a roughly trapezoidal shape with two distinct features: the upper edge has two small teeth, while the lower edge has irregular small teeth and dramatically expands at its base. The expanded bases of opposite leaves nearly touch each other along the underside of the stem, forming a comb-like structure. The leaf cells are unusually large (about 66–100 micrometres) with thin walls and lack the reinforced corners (trigones) common in many liverworts.

Haesselia roraimensis is dioicous, meaning male and female reproductive structures occur on separate plants. The male structures (androecia) typically appear at the tips of main shoots, while the female structures (gynoecia) can occur either at the tip of main shoots or on long side branches. When present, the perianth (the protective structure surrounding the female reproductive organs) is long, cylindrical, and projects well beyond the surrounding leaves. It has three distinct ridges in its upper half and a fringe of small bristles at its mouth.

The species lacks underleaves (small leaves on the underside of the stem that are present in many liverworts), though very young portions of the shoot have a single, pear-shaped slime papilla in their place. Root-like structures (rhizoids) are either absent or sparsely produced on the lower side of branches.

== Habitat, distribution, and ecology ==
Haesselia roraimensis is known only from Mount Roraima in Guyana, specifically from its northern slopes and foothills, where it grows at elevations between 550–1,550 m (1,800–5,090 ft) above sea level. The species appears to flourish particularly well at altitudes between 700–1,400 m (2,300–4,600 ft). The liverwort inhabits two distinct forest types: periodically flooded riverine forest and dense, humid submontane "mossy" forest at the foot of Mount Roraima. Within these habitats, it primarily grows on decomposing logs and dead wood, where it can form extensive mats. Less commonly, it can be found growing on the bases of tree trunks and exposed roots. H. roraimensis grows alongside various other bryophytes, including Anomoclada mucosa, Leucobryum crispum, Micropterygium trachyphyllum, and species of Riccardia. It is also found in association with members of the moss families Hookeriaceae and Sematophyllaceae.

The species is one of only three liverwort genera endemic to the Guyana Highlands, alongside Odontoseries and Trabacellula. All three have been found only in the eastern portion of the Highlands, in the vicinity of the tepuis (table-top mountains) surrounding the Gran Sabana. However, as the bryophyte flora of the Guyana Highlands remains poorly studied, the true extent of the species' distribution may be larger than suspected.
