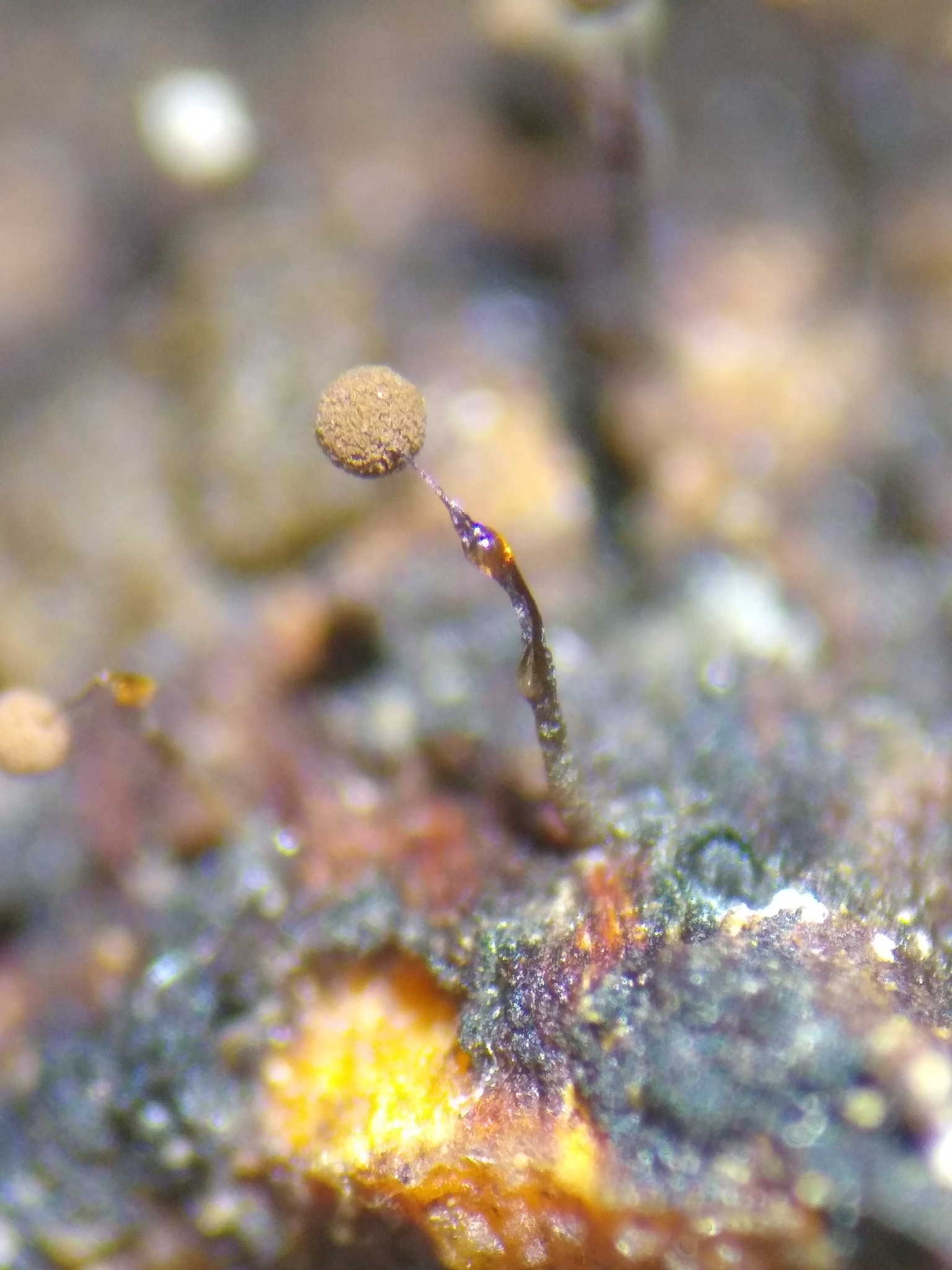

Scientific classification
- Domain: Eukaryota
- Phylum: Amoebozoa
- Class: Myxogastria
- Order: Echinosteliales
- Family: Clastodermataceae
- Genus: Clastoderma
- Species: C. debaryanum

Binomial name
- Clastoderma debaryanum A. Blytt 1880

= Clastoderma debaryanum =

Species of slime mold

Clastoderma debaryanum is a species of slime mold in the family Clastodermataceae. It has been recorded in every continent except for Antarctica.

This species is found on decaying wood or bark, but is not uncommon on the bark of living trees in moist chamber culture.

== Description ==
The fruiting bodies are a stalked sporangium, approximately 1 mm tall. Light brown and globular sporotheca between 0.1 and 0.2 mm in diameter. Spores are 8–11 μm in diameter, with small warts. Plasmodium starts a watery white, but grows darker with age.
