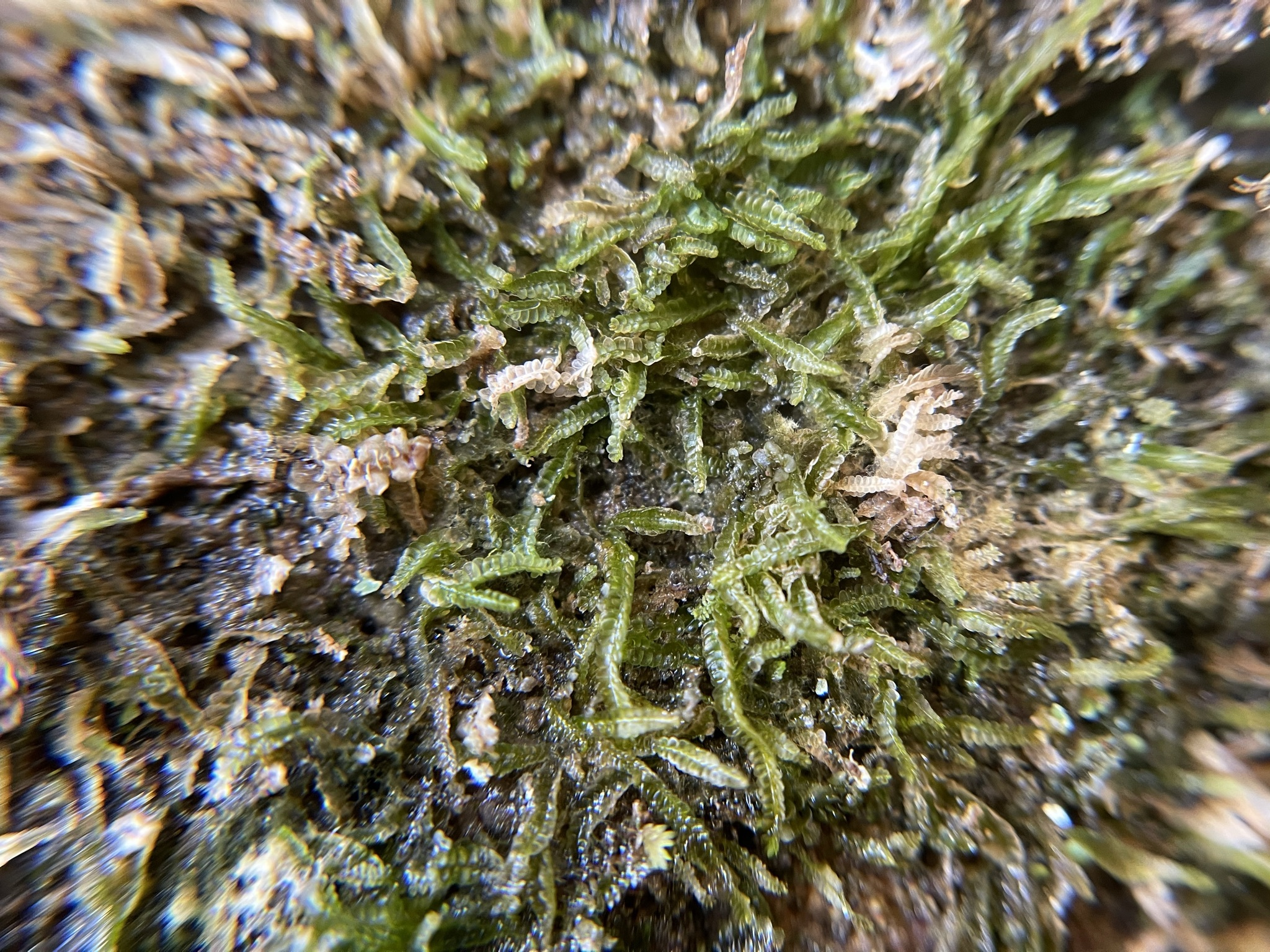

Scientific classification
- Kingdom: Plantae
- Division: Marchantiophyta
- Class: Jungermanniopsida
- Order: Lophoziales
- Family: Cephaloziaceae
- Genus: Odontoschisma
- Species: O. sphagni

Binomial name
- Odontoschisma sphagni (Dicks.) Dumort.

Synonyms
- Cephalozia sphagni; O. prostratum

= Odontoschisma sphagni =

Species of liverwort

Odontoschisma sphagni, commonly known as bog-moss flapwort, is a species of liverwort in the family Cephaloziaceae. It grows in raised bogs on moist, peaty soil, on rotten and dead wood or on thin soil covering moist sandstone rock in evergreen or deciduous forests. It sometimes grows among mosses.

== Description ==
it is a prostrate plant, meaning it grows horizontally rather than upwards; in large, dense mats. Pale yellow-green to reddish-brown in colour. Leafy shoots are between 1-5 cm long and 1.2-3 mm wide, usually not branched. The stem is colourless and rigid; 10-15 cells tall, made of 60-120 epidermis cells around 70-100 larger inner cells. Undivided flat leaves, 0.9-1.4 mm long, and cylindrical perianths. Spores are 10-15 μm in diameter. Gemmae absent.

== Distribution ==
O. sphagni is found in temperate-suboceanic areas of Europe and North America, as well northern Mexico. It grows at low elevations, up to 1,500 meters in Jamaica. In Europe, it is found in Poland, western Russia, Bulgaria, northern Italy and Spain, Madeira and the Azores.

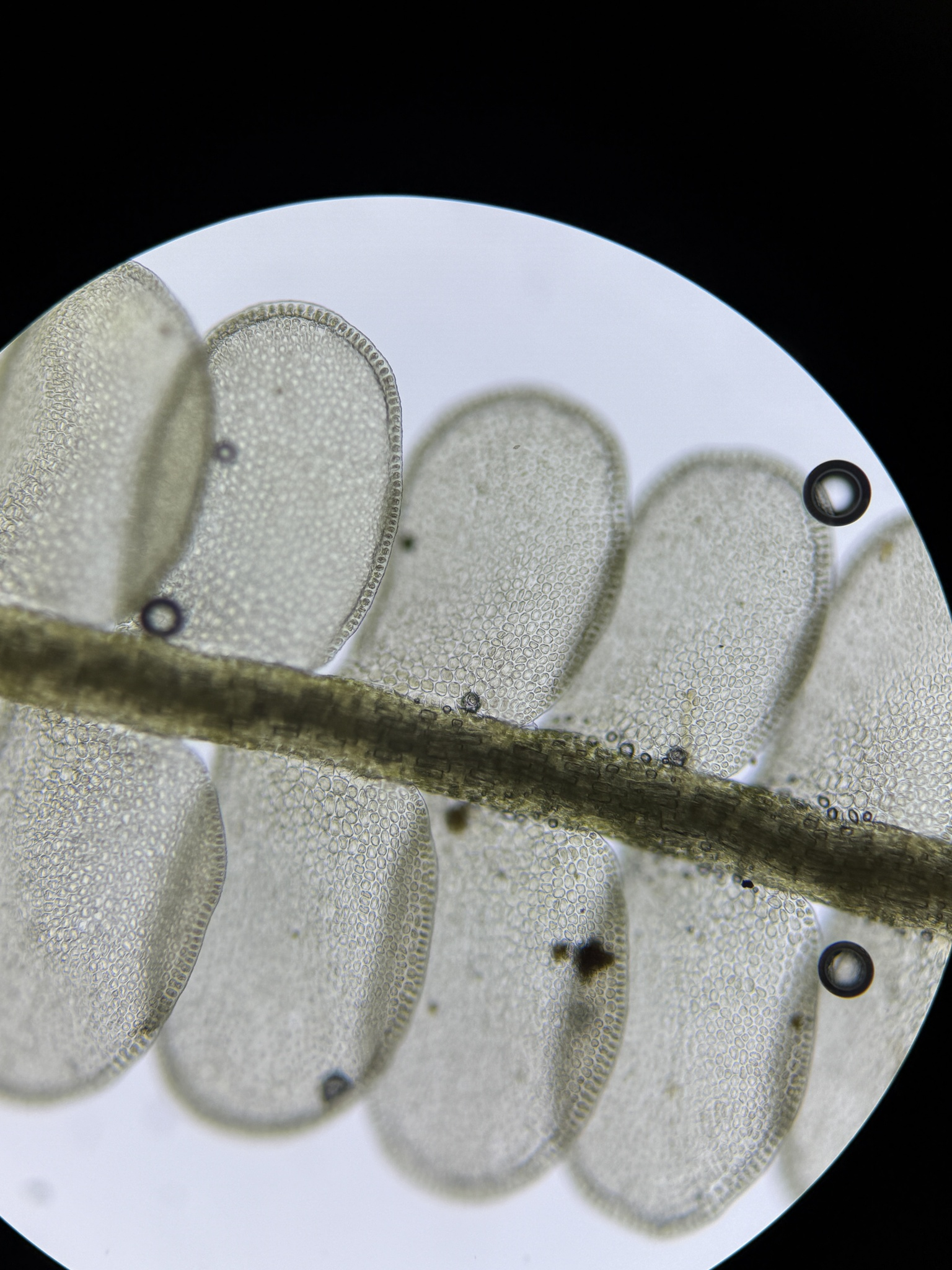
Under a microscope.

In the New World, O. sphagni was originally described as O. prostratum. Compared to Europe, O. sphagni in the Americas is slightly smaller, and prefer to grow on soil or soils over rock.
