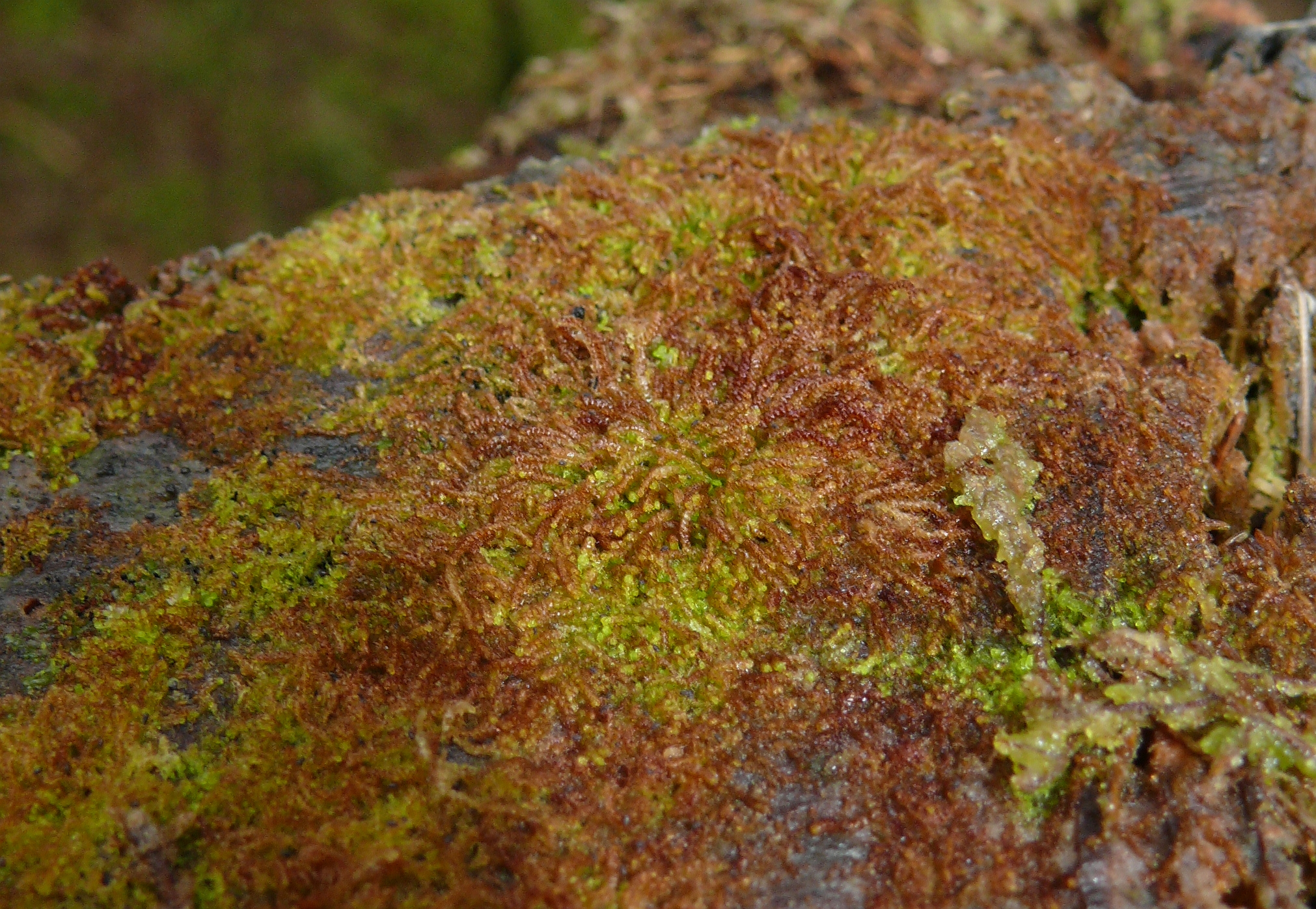

Conservation status
- Least Concern (IUCN 3.1) (Europe regional assessment)

- Secure (NatureServe)

Scientific classification
- Kingdom: Plantae
- Division: Marchantiophyta
- Class: Jungermanniopsida
- Order: Lophoziales
- Family: Cephaloziaceae
- Genus: Nowellia
- Species: N. curvifolia

Binomial name
- Nowellia curvifolia (Dicks.) Mitt.

Synonyms
- Jungermannia curvifolia Dicks.; Jungermannia birostrata Schleich. ex DC.; Jungermannia baueri Mart.; Cephalozia curvifolia (Dicks.) Dumort.; Cephalozia baueri (Mart.) C. Massal.; Trigonanthus curvifolius (Dicks.) Hartm.; Cephalozia bicuspidata var. curvifolia (Dicks.) Cooke; Jungermannia bicuspidata var. curvifolia (Dicks.) Hartm.; Cephalozia curvifolia var. baueri (Mart.) Dumort.; Nowellia curvifolia var. myriantha Meyl.; Nowellia curvifolia f. radiculosa Latzel; Jungermannia curvifolia f. baueri (Mart.) Nees; Jungermannia curvifolia f. imbricata Nees; Jungermannia curvifolia var. minor Grognot; Jungermannia curvifolia var. baueri (Mart.) Lindenb.; Cephalozia curvifolia var. curvifolia; Jungermannia curvifolia var. curvifolia; Nowellia curvifolia f. curvifolia; Nowellia curvifolia var. curvifolia

= Nowellia curvifolia =

Species of liverwort

Nowellia curvifolia is a species of liverwort belonging to the family Cephaloziaceae. It is a small, delicate plant that forms prostrate growths on rotting logs in forests throughout the northern temperate and subarctic regions (the Holarctic realm). The species is distinguished by its distinctive billowed leaves arranged in two rows, each divided into two pointed lobes with the lower lobe forming a specialised water-holding pocket called a water-sac. The plant shows seasonal colour variation from rose to purple to brown to spring green, developing reddish-purple pigmentation in autumn and winter. It reproduces both sexually, through spores produced in reddish-brown capsules, and asexually via single-celled gemmae. N. curvifolia serves as an indicator species in forest ecosystems, particularly in montane spruce-fir forests, where it often forms pure mats on decorticated logs and is associated with the slime mould species Barbeyella minutissima.

== Taxonomy ==
Nowellia curvifolia was first described by James Dickson in 1790 as Jungermannia curvifolia. In his original description, Dickson noted the presence of billowed, bilobed leaves but did not mention the distinctive water-sacs that would later become an important taxonomic feature. In 1817, Carl Friedrich Philipp von Martius described what he believed was a separate species, Jungermannia bauri, distinguished by the presence of water-sacs. Johann Bernhard Wilhelm Lindenberg united these taxa in 1829, recognising they were the same species, though many botanists continued to treat them as separate until the late 1800s.

The species was later recognised as closely related to Jungermannia bicuspidata and J. connivens by William Jackson Hooker (1812), and all three were placed in the genus Cephalozia by Barthélemy Charles Joseph Dumortier in 1835. The species gained its current placement when William Mitten established the genus Nowellia in 1870, making N. curvifolia the type species. This new taxonomic arrangement was gradually accepted following the works of Victor Félix Schiffner (1895), Franz Stephani (1908), and Müller (1912).

Within its current genus, N. curvifolia belongs to the subgenus Nowellia and serves as the type species for both the genus and subgenus. It is distinguished from other members of the family Cephaloziaceae by its distinctive water-sacs, by the way its leaves attach to the stem (almost straight across but with a slight tendency to overlap like roof shingles when viewed from below), and by having a short line where the leaf connects to the stem.

== Description ==
Nowellia curvifolia is a delicate liverwort that forms small, prostrate (lying flat) growths. The plant has striking colours, which can range from rose to purple to brown to spring green, with reddish-purple pigmentation often developing during autumn and winter months. The leaves are its most distinctive feature, arranged in two rows along the stem and having a unique structure that makes them resemble tiny billowed sails. Each leaf is divided into two pointed lobes, with the lower (ventral) lobe being larger than the upper (dorsal) one. The lower lobe's edge is folded inward to form a specialised water-holding pocket called a water-sac, a feature that distinguishes this species from its relatives.

The stem has a relatively simple structure, with a single layer of large, clear outer cells (called a hyalodermis) surrounding a core of smaller, elongated inner cells. The plant attaches itself to its substrate using thread-like structures (rhizoids), which grow from the underside of the stem. These rhizoids develop branched tips where they contact the growing surface.

Microscopic features
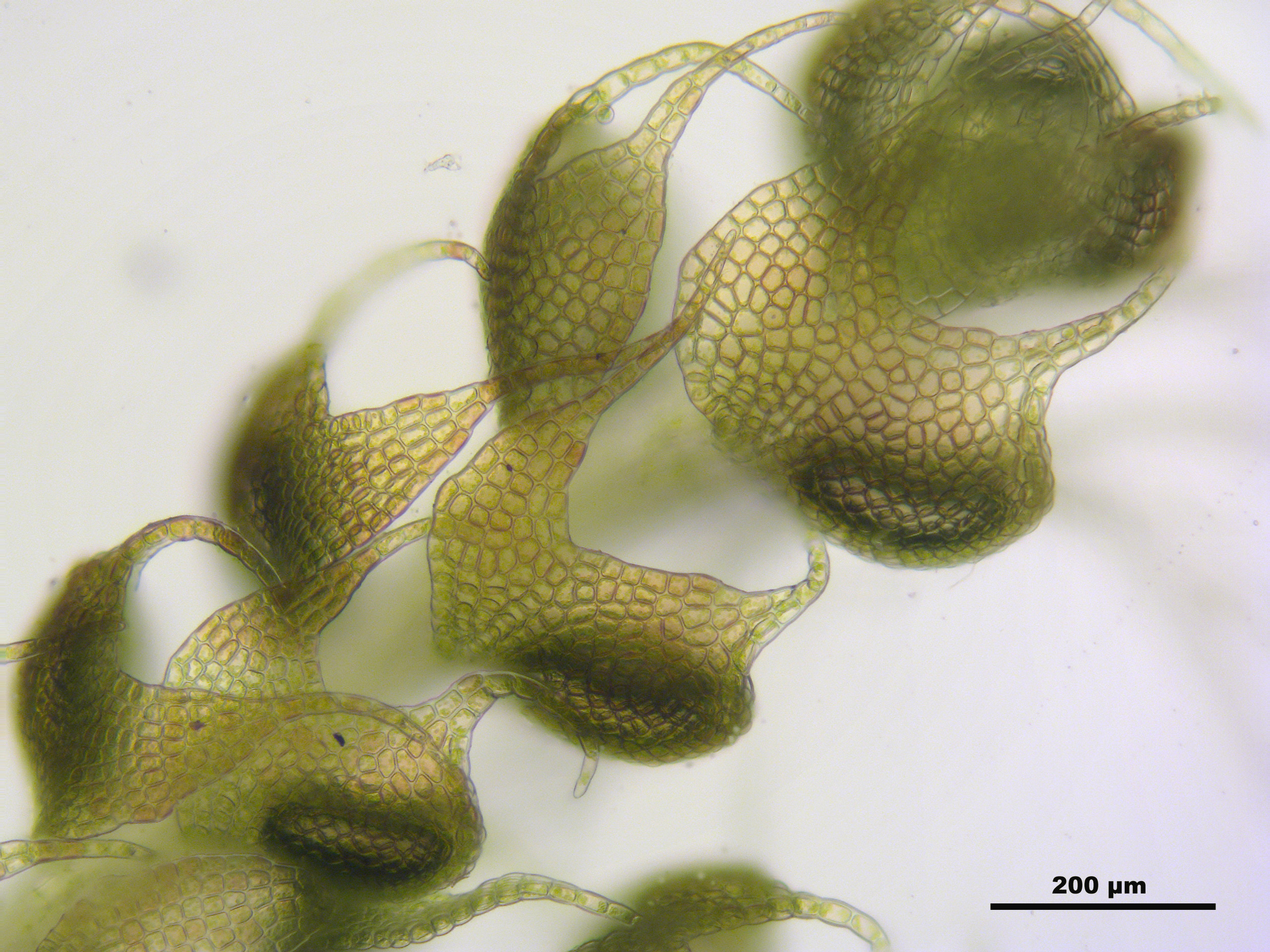
Microscopic view of N. curvifolia leaves showing their distinctive curved, water-sac structures and cellular pattern. Scale bar: 200 μm.

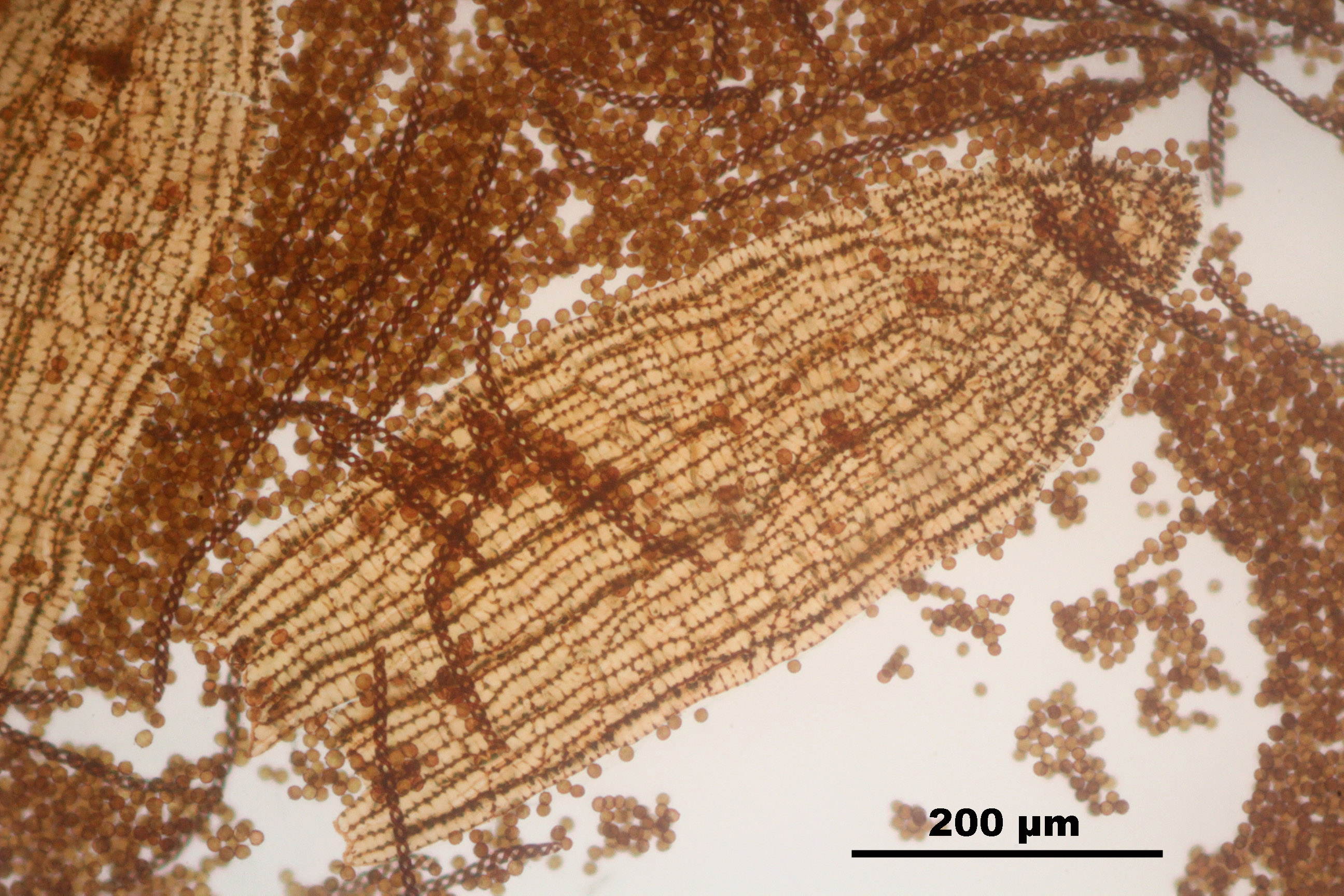
Microscopic view showing the elongated cells of the hyalodermis (outer stem layer) of N. curvifolia. Scale bar: 200 μm.

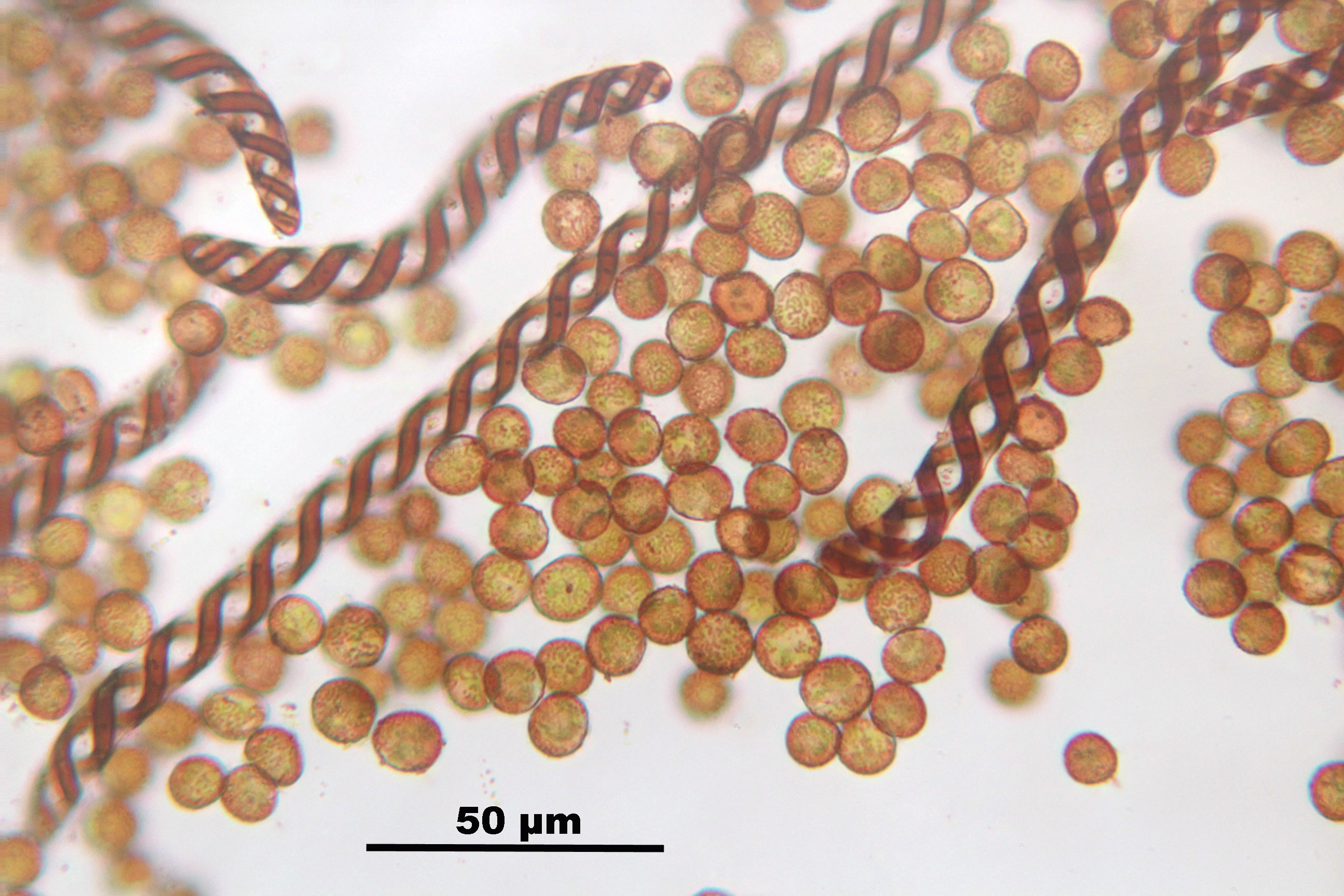
Microscopic view of spores and elaters from N. curvifolia. The coiled elaters help disperse the spherical spores when the capsule splits. Scale bar: 50 μm.

The species reproduces both sexually and asexually. Asexual reproduction occurs through specialised reproductive structures called gemmae, which are small, spherical, single-celled bodies produced at the tips of leaves. Sexual reproduction involves separate male and female plants (the species is dioicous), with the female plants producing oval spore capsules that are reddish-brown in colour when mature. The capsule opens by splitting into four parts to release its spores, which are assisted in dispersal by specialised coiled structures called elaters.

The plant's size is diminutive, with individual leaves measuring less than half a millimetre (400–470 micrometres) in width, making it necessary to use a hand lens or microscope to observe its detailed features.

The species shows developmental plasticity. Research has shown that when treated with compounds that interfere with normal proline-hydroxyproline-protein synthesis (specifically hydroxy-L-proline and 2,2'-dipyridyl), N. curvifolia can develop morphological variations including ventral leaves (which are normally absent) and increased branching patterns. These induced variations are temporary and the plants revert to their typical form when the treatment ends, suggesting the species retains the genetic capacity to produce these alternative forms despite not normally expressing them. The species has been used in scientific research as a model organism for studying plant cell wall proteins and developmental biology, particularly the role of arabinogalactan proteins in liverwort morphology and development.

== Distribution and habitat ==
Nowellia curvifolia is a widespread Holarctic species, meaning it occurs throughout the northern temperate and subarctic regions of the world. Genetic studies of specimens from different regions have revealed significant differences between populations: European and North American populations are genetically very similar (99.98% genetic identity), while Asian populations show much greater divergence (97.49% genetic identity) from both European and North American specimens. This level of genetic differentiation suggests there may be cryptic species within what is currently recognised as N. curvifolia, particularly in Asia, or the presence of distinct geographical races.

Nowellia curvifolia grows on rotting logs in forests and appears to be an important indicator species in forest ecosystems. The liverwort is particularly associated with certain myxomycete species like Barbeyella minutissima, a rare slime mould that occurs primarily in montane spruce-fir forests. N. curvifolia often forms nearly pure mats on decorticated logs and shows a pH preference between 4.6 and 5.2, frequently occurring as a pioneer species on decorticated (bark-free) logs.
