= Nowellia wrightii =

Conservation status
- Vulnerable (IUCN 2.3)

Scientific classification
- Kingdom: Plantae
- Division: Marchantiophyta
- Class: Jungermanniopsida
- Order: Lophoziales
- Family: Cephaloziaceae
- Genus: Nowellia
- Species: N. wrightii

Binomial name
- Nowellia wrightii Grolle

Species of liverwort

Nowellia wrightii is a species of liverwort in the family Cephaloziaceae. It is endemic to Cuba. Its natural habitat is subtropical or tropical moist lowland forests.
