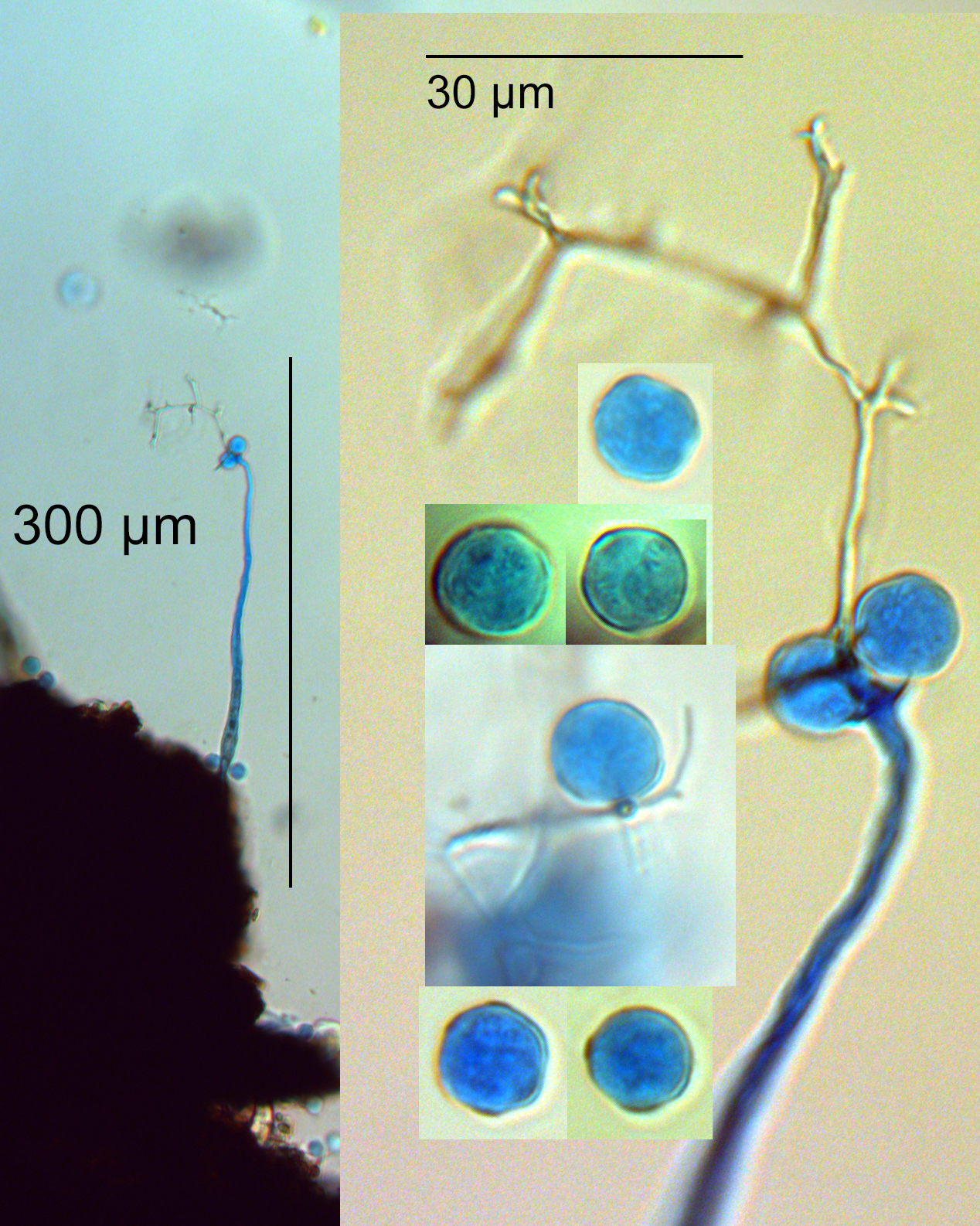
- Echinostelium minutum

Scientific classification
- Domain: Eukaryota
- Clade: Amorphea
- Phylum: Amoebozoa
- Class: Myxogastria
- Order: Echinosteliales
- Family: Echinosteliaceae
- Genus: Echinostelium; De Bary, 1855

Type species
- Echinostelium minutum De Bary, 1855

= Echinostelium =

Genus of slime moulds

Echinostelium is a genus of slime mould, and the only genus in the monotypic family Echinosteliaceae, or Echinosteliidae. It was discovered by Heinrich Anton de Bary in 1855, apparently near Frankfurt am Main. Some species of Echinostelium have a sexual life cycle; others have been shown to be asexual. The plasmodium can divide vegetatively, in a process called plasmotomy, to distinguish it from true cell division.

== Species ==
The genus Echinostelium comprises at least five species:

- Echinostelium apitectum K. D. Whitney, 1980
- Echinostelium colliculosum K. D. Whitney & H. W. Keller, 1980
- Echinostelium corynophorum K. D. Whitney, 1980
- Echinostelium fragile Nannenga-Bremekamp, 1961
- Echinostelium minutum De Bary in Rostafinsky, 1874
