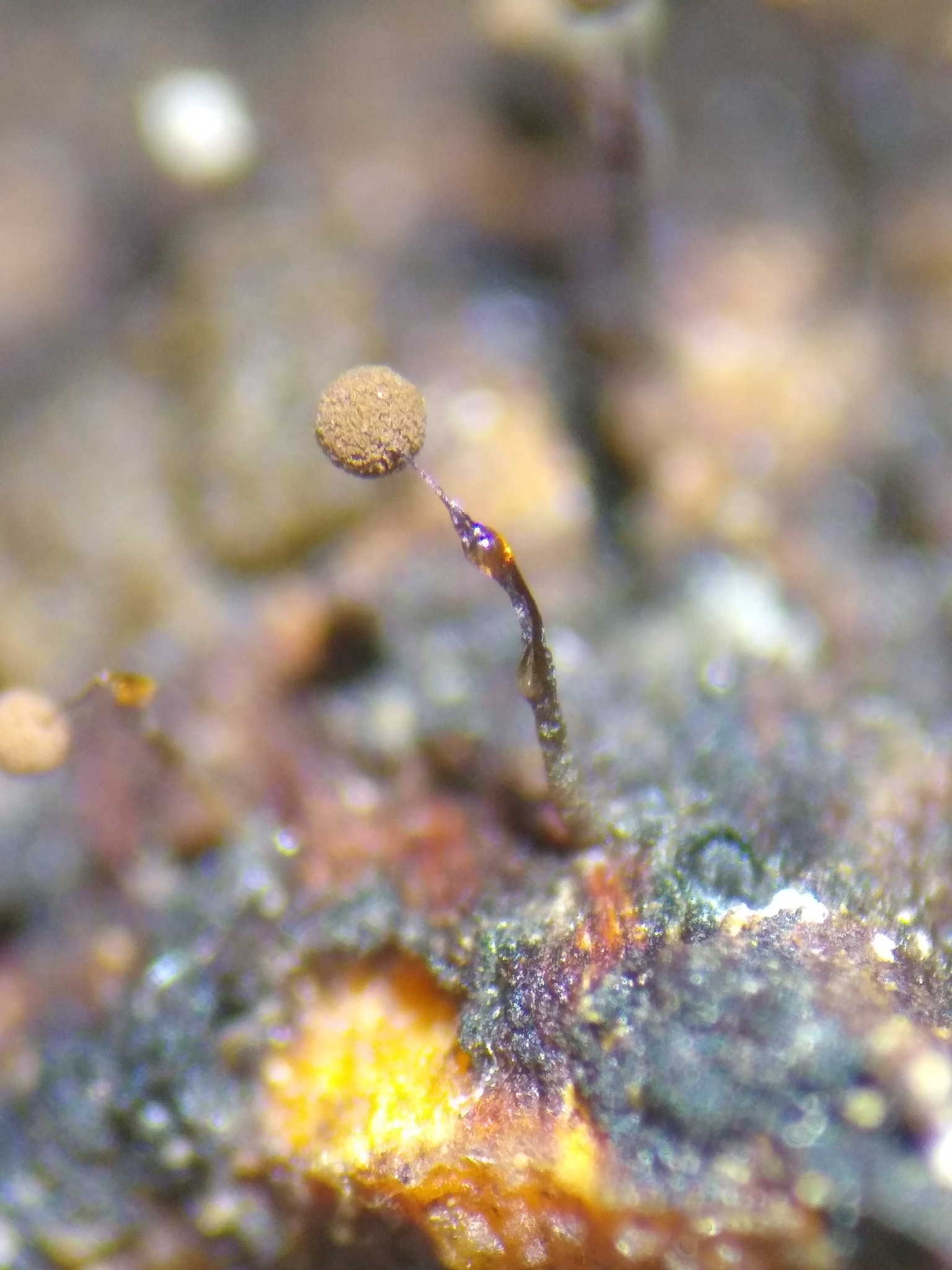
- Clastoderma debaryanum

Scientific classification
- Domain: Eukaryota
- Phylum: Amoebozoa
- Class: Myxogastria
- Order: Echinosteliales
- Family: Clastodermataceae
- Genus: Clastoderma; A.Blytt

Species
- See text

= Clastoderma =

Genus of slime moulds

Clastoderma is a species of slime mould in the family Clastodermataceae.

== Species ==
As of November 2025, the Global Biodiversity Information Facility accepted four species:

- Clastoderma confusum K.J.Knight & Lado, 2020
- Clastoderma debaryanum A.Blytt, 1880
- Clastoderma microcarpum (Meyl.) Kowalski, 1975
- Clastoderma pachypus Nann.-Bremek., 1968
