= Paul Frédéric Culmann =

Swiss physicist

Paul Frédéric Culmann (23 February 1860, Zürich – 27 November 1936, Paris) was a Swiss physicist known for contributions made in the field of bryology.

== Biography ==
From 1878 to 1882 he studied physics at the Eidgenössischen Polytechnikum in Zurich, then continued his education in Berlin, where he earned his PhD in 1885. Following graduation, he was employed at the "Maison Bréguet" in Paris (1885–93), and later worked as an instructor of physics and mathematics at the Technikum Winterthur (1893–98). Afterwards, he returned to Paris, where he was associated with work done at the "Maison Carl Zeiss".

== Research ==
Culmann was considered one on the leading Swiss bryologists during the early part of the 20th century. He collected thousands of moss specimens in Switzerland, mostly in the cantons of Zurich and Berne. During his career, he also collected extensively in France. In regards to the canton of Zurich, he published a directory of its mosses (1901), and later issued a listing of liverworts native to the canton (1906). Furthermore, he was the author of numerous papers on findings from the Bernese Oberland, the canton of Ticino and also from France. As a taxonomist he described more than 20 species, subspecies and varieties that were new to science.

The moss species Bryum culmannii is named after him, being circumscribed by Karl Gustav Limpricht in 1892.

== Partial bibliography ==
- 1901 Verzeichnis der Laubmoose des Kantons Zürich. — Mitteilungen der Naturwissenschaftlichen Gesellschaft in Winterthur 3: 3–79.
- 1903 Notes bryologiques sur les flores du canton de Zurich et des environs de Paris, — Revue Bryologique 30: 89–92.
- 1905 Contributions à la flore bryologique du canton de Bern. — Revue Bryologique 32: 73–79.
- 1906 Liste des Hépatiques du canton de Zurich — Revue Bryologique 33: 75–84.
- 1906 Contributions à la flore bryologique Suisse. — Revue Bryologique 33: 75–84.
- 1908 Contributions à la flore bryologique Suisse et principalement à celle de l'Oberland bernois. — Revue Bryologique 35: 19–28.
- 1915 Contribution à la flore bryologique du canton du Tessin, — Bulletin de la societé botanique de France 62, 4,15: 53-58.

With Jules Amann and Charles Meylan, he was co-author of Flore des mousses de la Suisse, (Lausanne : Imprimeries R'eunies S.A., 1912).
