= Jules Amann =

Swiss pharmacist and botanist

Jean Jules Amann (8 March 1859, Lausanne – 1 February 1939, Lausanne) was a Swiss pharmacist and botanist. He was a leading expert on mosses native to Switzerland.

== Biography ==
He studied chemistry at the University of Lausanne and in 1883 earned his pharmacy diploma in Zürich. He then worked as a pharmacist in Rheinfelden and Zürich, and in 1886 he purchased the Englische Apotheke in Davos. In 1893 he returned to Lausanne, where he later taught classes in microscopy at the pharmacy school associated with the university. In 1901 he established his own research laboratory. He is known for creating an index to measure hygrothermy, a measurement of climatic variably for Atlantic oceanic climates that was used to consider plant distribution.

== Published works ==
- Étude de la flore bryologique du Valais, 1899 – Study on the bryology of Valais.
- Flore des mousses de la Suisse, 1912 (with Charles Meylan and Paul Frédéric Culmann) – Mosses of Switzerland.
- Bryogéographie de la Suisse, 1928 – Bryogeography of Switzerland.
- Etude des Muscinées du Massif de Naye. 1935 – Study on the mosses of Massif de Naye.
