= Gabriela Hässel de Menéndez =

Argentine bryologist (1927-2009)

- Born: Gabriela Gustava Hässel; 15 October 1927; Quilmes, Argentina
- Died: 4 July 2009 (aged 81)
- Occupation: Botanist
- Spouse: Carlos Alberto Menéndez
- Children: 2
- Awards: Guggenheim Fellowship (1962); Konex Award (1983)

Academic background
- Education: Faculty of Exact and Natural Sciences

Academic work
- Discipline: Bryology
- Sub-discipline: Hepaticology
- Institutions: University of Buenos Aires; Bernardino Rivadavia Natural Sciences Argentine Museum; National Scientific and Technical Research Council

Gabriela Gustava Hässel de Menéndez (15 October 1927 – 4 July 2009) was an Argentine bryologist who worked in liverworts and hornworts. Originally a botany professor at the Faculty of Pharmacy and Biochemistry, University of Buenos Aires, she left to become a National Scientific and Technical Research Council (CONICET) researcher and was head of the Bernardino Rivadavia Natural Sciences Argentine Museum's cryptogamy division from 1962 until 2000. She was a 1962 Guggenheim Fellow and received a 1983 Konex Award.

== Biography ==
Hässel was born on 15 October 1927 in Quilmes, a city south of Buenos Aires. Originally studying natural sciences at the Faculty of Exact and Natural Sciences, she decided to switch to biology after one of the professors there, Alberto Castellanos, suggested the idea. She obtained her licentiate in 1952 and doctorate in natural sciences in 1959. She was also a 1953-1954 German Academic Exchange Service postgraduate student at the Institute of Botany at the Ludwig-Maximilians-Universität München.

In 1948 or 1949, Hässel started as an unpaid assistant at the botany department of the Bernardino Rivadavia Natural Sciences Argentine Museum, working in a herbarium without any reference works or movable types. After receiving an official appointment at the museum in 1956, she served as head of the museum's cryptogamy division from 1962 until 2000. As division head, she presided over a spike in recorded specimens and restructured the cryptogamic herbarium. In 2002, she was made an honorary curator at the museum.

After working as a laboratory head at the Faculty of Pharmacy and Biochemistry, University of Buenos Aires from 1955 to 1957, Hässel de Menéndez became a professor of botany there in 1961. In 1962, she resigned her professor position to become a National Scientific and Technical Research Council researcher, serving until her death as well as within the Biological Sciences Advisory Committee. She was a 1974 Royal Society University Research Fellow, researching the British Antarctic Survey's South Georgia collections. She received a 2008 CONICET Gold Medal in honour of her becoming the first person to get a CONICET scholarship.

Hässel de Menéndez's work in bryology included liverworts and hornworts. She had dozens of solo publications, as well as specimens collected from dozens of research trips. In 1962, she was awarded a Guggenheim Fellowship to study liverwort taxonomy. She won the 1970 Cristobal Hicken Award, and in 1983, she received a Konex Award in Botany and Paleobotany. She was a board member of the Latin American Bryological Society from 1986 to 1988, in addition to being instrumental in promoting its creation. In a 1988 article in the Journal of the Hattori Botanical Laboratory, Robbert Gradstein and Riclef Grolle named the liverwort genus Haesselia in honour of Hässel de Menéndez, calling her "the [founder of] high standard hepaticology in Latin America". As part of her final publication, a Nova Hedwigia article titled "Catalogue of Marchantiophyta and Anthocerotophyta of Southern South America", she did indexing work for a bryology bibliography going back five decades.

Hässel de Menéndez died on 4 July 2009. She had two children with her husband Carlos Alberto Menéndez.
