= Haesselia =

Scientific classification
- Kingdom: Plantae
- Division: Marchantiophyta
- Class: Jungermanniopsida
- Order: Lophoziales
- Family: Cephaloziaceae
- Genus: Haesselia; Grolle & Gradst.

Genus of liverworts

Haesselia is a genus of liverworts in the family Cephaloziaceae. It contains the following species (but this list may be incomplete):

- Haesselia roraimensis Grolle & Gradst.
- Haesselia acuminata Gradst.

The genus name of Haesselia is in honour of Gabriela Hässel de Menéndez (1927-2009), who was an Argentine bryologist.

The genus was circumscribed by Riclef Grolle and Stephan Robbert Gradstein in 1988.
