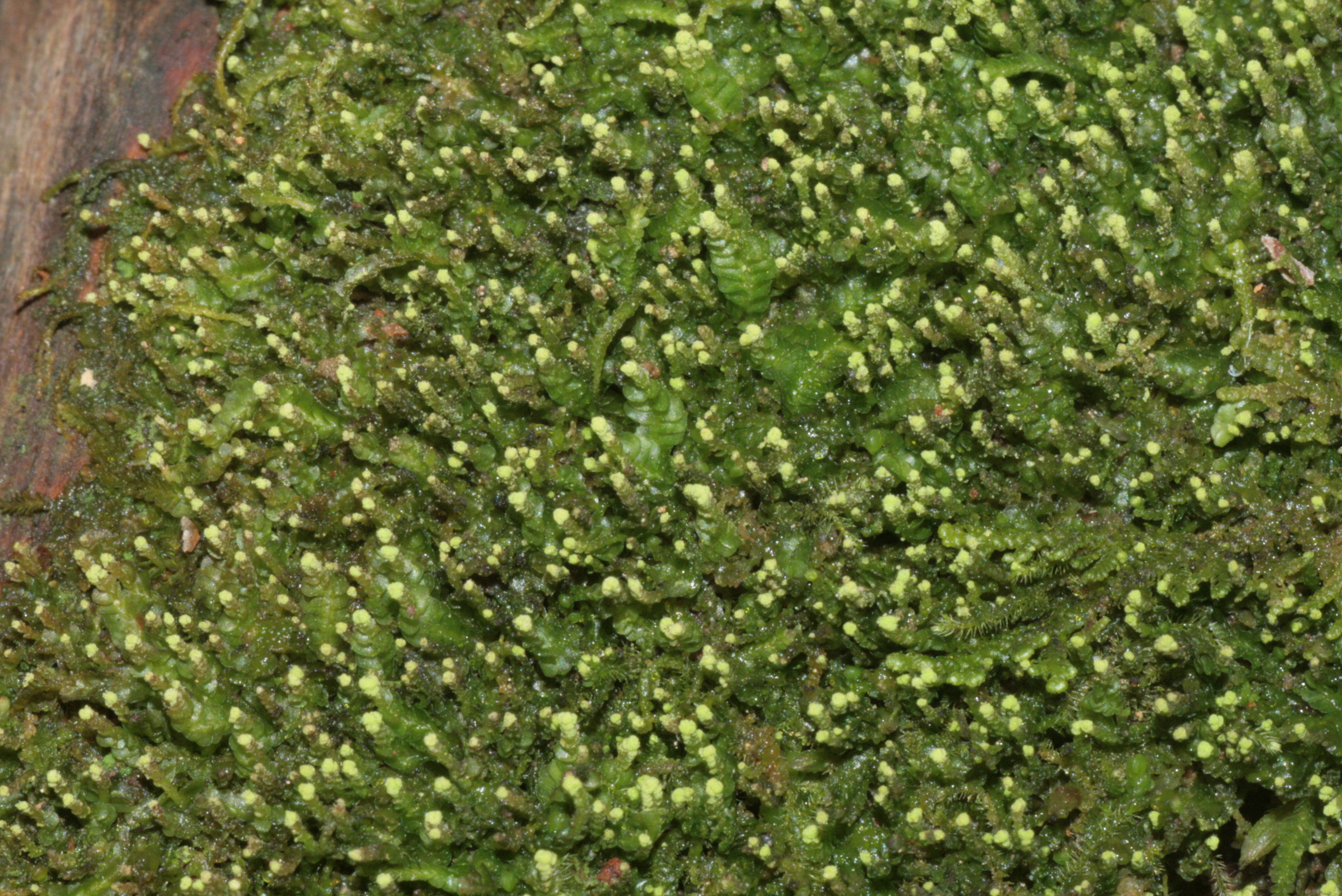
- Odontoschisma denudatum

Scientific classification
- Kingdom: Plantae
- Division: Marchantiophyta
- Class: Jungermanniopsida
- Order: Lophoziales
- Family: Cephaloziaceae; H.Buch ex Grolle
- Genus: Odontoschisma (Dumort.) Dumort.

Synonyms
- Anomoclada Spruce; Cephalozia subg. Odontoschisma (Dumort.) Spruce; Cladopodiella H.Buch; Iwatsukia N.Kitag.; Pleuroschisma sect. Odontoschisma Dumort.; Sphagnoecetis Nees

= Odontoschisma =

Genus of liverworts

Odontoschisma is a genus of liverworts belonging to the family Cephaloziaceae.

The genus has cosmopolitan distribution.

== Species ==
As accepted by GBIF;

- Odontoschisma africanum (Pearson) Sim
- Odontoschisma atropurpureum Stephani
- Odontoschisma bifidum (Fulford) Gradst., S.C.Aranda & Vanderp.
- Odontoschisma brasiliense Steph.
- Odontoschisma cleefii Gradst., S.C.Aranda & Vanderp.
- Odontoschisma cordifolium Stephani
- Odontoschisma denudatum (Mart.) Dumort.
- Odontoschisma dimorpha (Casp.) Heinrichs, K.Feldberg, Váňa & Schäf.-Verw.
- Odontoschisma elongatum (Lindb.) A.Evans
- Odontoschisma engelii Gradst. & Burghardt
- Odontoschisma fluitans (Nees) L.Söderstr. & Váňa
- Odontoschisma francisci (Hook.) L.Söderstr. & Váňa
- Odontoschisma gibbsiae A.Evans
- Odontoschisma grosseverrucosum Steph.
- Odontoschisma jishibae (Steph.) L.Söderstr. & Váňa
- Odontoschisma longiflorum (Taylor) Trevis.
- Odontoschisma longiflorum Stephani
- Odontoschisma lutescens S.Hatt.
- Odontoschisma macounii (Austin) Underw.
- Odontoschisma navicularis (Stephani) Grolle
- Odontoschisma obcordatum (Spruce) Steph.
- Odontoschisma portoricense (Hampe & Gottsche) Steph.
- Odontoschisma prostratum (Sw.) Trevis.
- Odontoschisma pseudogrosseverrucosum Gradst., S.C.Aranda & Vanderp.
- Odontoschisma purpuratum Herzog
- Odontoschisma soratamum Fulford
- Odontoschisma sphagni (Dicks.) Dumort.
- Odontoschisma spinosum (Fulford) Gradst., S.C.Aranda & Vanderp.
- Odontoschisma steyermarkii Gradst. & Ilk.-Borg.
- Odontoschisma stoloniferum (Lindenb. & Gottsche) Trevis.
- Odontoschisma tahitense Besch., 1898
- Odontoschisma variabile (Lindenb. & Gottsche) Trevis.
- Odontoschisma yunnanense K.Feldberg, Váňa, D.G.Long & Heinrichs
- Odontoschisma zhui Gradst., S.C.Aranda & Vanderp.
