= Hygrothermy =

Equation used by climate modellers

Hygrothermy is a measurement of climatic variability for Atlantic oceanic climates using measurements of moisture and warmth as a numerical expression of the degree to which a given climate is oceanic. Amann's index of hygrothermy (or just index of hygrothermy) is an climatic index proposed by the Swiss botanist Jules Amann. The equation was first published in his paper L'hygrothermie du climat, facteur déterminant la répartition des espèces atlantiques (1929).

== Formula ==
Hygrothermy ($H$) is measured by the following equation:

$H = \frac{P \times T}{T_h - T_c}$

Where:

- $P$ = mean annual precipitation
- $T$ = mean annual temperature
- $T_h$ = mean temperature of the warmest month
- $T_c$ = mean temperature of the coldest month

The numerator increases with greater rainfall and higher mean temperature, while the denominator represents the annual temperature range as a proxy for continentality. A narrow temperature range, characteristic of oceanic climates, produces a smaller denominator and thus a higher index value.

== Background ==
Amann developed the index to investigate the climatic factors governing the distribution of Atlantic plant species, primarily being those found along the Atlantic coastlines of Europe and North America. He identified three biogeographical subgroups within the Atlantic flora:

- Euro-Atlantic species, largely confined to the European Atlantic seaboard.
- Sub-Atlantic species, with a broader distribution extending into the Mediterranean region.
- Euryatlantic species, present in both the European and North American Atlantic regions.

These species share a general requirement for oceanic climatic conditions: relatively high rainfall, mild winters, cool summers, and low annual temperature variability; but often differ in edaphic preferences such as substrate pH.

Amann also noted that the index is not suited to highly localised studies, as the survival of Atlantic species can depend on microclimatic conditions that differ substantially from the regional climate. This is particularly relevant for poikilohydric organisms such as bryophytes, which are sensitive to the moisture and temperature conditions of their immediate surroundings.

== Applications ==
Amann's index has been used to map zones of oceanicity across Britain. Early applications by Greig-Smith (1950) and Proctor (1960) used the index to explain the distribution of bryophytes along Britain's western seaboard, though at that time relatively few meteorological stations existed in western Britain to provide detailed climatic data. The index has also been applied in studies of lichen biogeography, where it has been used alongside other measures of oceanicity to explain species distributions in the Scottish Highlands.

Using more recent Met Office climate data at the hectad scale, Ellis (2016) proposed threshold values of H ≥ 100 for oceanic climates and H ≥ 150 for hyper-oceanic climates. The oceanic zone covered approximately 27% of the British land surface (710 hectads), occurring extensively along the Atlantic coastline. The hyper-oceanic zone, at approximately 8% (212 hectads), was largely restricted to north-western Scotland, with outlying areas in the Lake District, Wales, and south-west England. Ellis also demonstrated that the five climatic variables commonly used in species distribution modelling explained 98% of the spatial variation in hygrothermy, confirming a functional relationship between the index and the bioclimatic variables governing epiphyte distributions in Britain.

== See also ==
- Oceanic climate
- Climate change
- Climate model
- Climate variability and change
- Köppen climate classification
- Temperate rainforest
