= Oceanic climate =

Climate classification

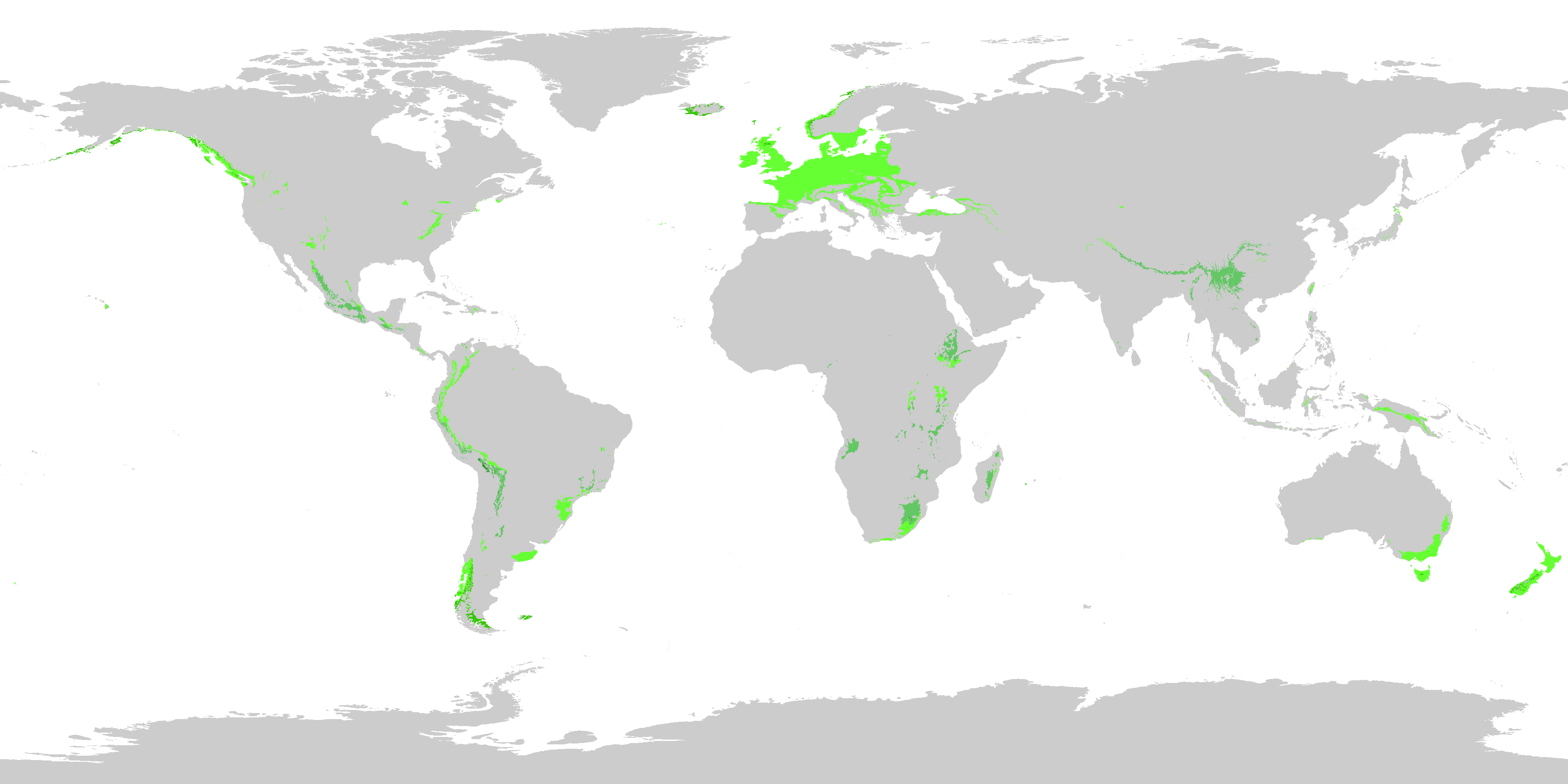
Regions where oceanic or subtropical highland climates (Cfb, Cfc, Cwb, Cwc) are found as of 1991-2020, using the −3 °C (27 °F) threshold for the coldest month.: Cfb; Cfc; Cwb; Cwc

An oceanic climate, also known as a marine climate or maritime climate, is the temperate climate sub-type in Köppen classification represented as Cfb or represented as Do under the Trewartha climate classification, typical of west coasts in higher middle latitudes of continents, generally featuring warm summers and cool to mild winters (for their latitude), with a relatively narrow annual temperature range and few extremes of temperature under Köppen's system or mediocre growing seasons with mild winters under Trewartha's. Oceanic climates can be found in both hemispheres generally between 40 and 60 degrees latitude, with subpolar versions extending to 70 degrees latitude in some coastal areas and some hot-summer oceanic climates extending to just north of 35 degrees North latitude in North America and Honshu and just south of 35 degrees North latitude in Mainland China under the Trewartha classification. Other varieties of climates usually classified together with these under the Köppen system include subtropical highland climates, represented as Cwb or Cfb, and subpolar oceanic or cold subtropical highland climates, represented as Cfc or Cwc. Subtropical highland climates occur in some mountainous parts of the subtropics or tropics, some of which have monsoon influence, while their cold variants and subpolar oceanic climates occur near polar or tundra regions.

== Cause ==
=== Physical mechanisms ===
Oceanic climates are primarily influenced by the thermal properties of the ocean and by the prevailing atmospheric circulation of the mid-latitudes. Water has a higher heat capacity than land and can store large amounts of solar energy during the warmer months, releasing this energy gradually during the colder months. This reduces seasonal temperature contrasts in coastal areas compared with locations at similar latitudes farther inland. In the mid-latitudes, prevailing westerly winds frequently transport maritime air masses from the ocean toward the continents. The passage of extratropical cyclones and associated frontal systems contributes to frequent changes in weather and to precipitation throughout much of the year. As a result, oceanic climates generally have relatively mild summers, cool to mild winters, and a comparatively small annual temperature range. Ocean currents can further modify these characteristics by transporting heat between different parts of the ocean. The effect of ocean circulation is particularly important in western Europe, where the North Atlantic Ocean and its associated circulation contribute to relatively mild conditions compared with other regions at similar latitudes. However, regional climate is determined by the combined effects of oceanic heat transport, atmospheric circulation, latitude, elevation, and topography rather than by any single ocean current.

Oceanic climates are not necessarily found in coastal locations on the aforementioned parallels; however, in most cases oceanic climates parallel higher middle latitude oceans. The polar jet stream, which moves in a west to east direction across the middle latitudes, advances low pressure systems, storms, and fronts. In coastal areas of the higher middle latitudes (45–60° latitude), the prevailing onshore flow creates the basic structure of most oceanic climates. Oceanic climates are a product and reflection of the cool ocean adjacent to them. In the autumn, winter, and early spring, when the polar jet stream is most active, the frequent passing of marine weather systems creates the frequent fog, cloudy skies, and light drizzle often associated with oceanic climates. They are typically found poleward of Mediterranean climates, except in Australia where they are poleward of both such climates and humid subtropical climates due to the shape of the continent. Only in Europe do they penetrate far inland, where they eventually transition into warm-summer humid continental climates; in other continents, they are blocked by a large mountain range or limited by nearby oceans.

The North Atlantic Gulf Stream, a tropical oceanic current that passes north of the Caribbean and up the East Coast of the United States to North Carolina, then heads east-northeast to the Grand Banks of Newfoundland, is thought to greatly modify the climate of northwest Europe. As a result of the North Atlantic Current, west coast areas located in high latitudes like Ireland, the UK, and Norway have much milder winters (for their latitude) than would otherwise be the case. The lowland attributes of western Europe also help drive marine air masses into continental areas, enabling cities such as Dresden, Prague, and Vienna to have maritime climates in spite of being located well inland from the ocean.

=== Variability ===
Although oceanic climates are characterized by relatively moderate temperatures, they are not free from substantial interannual variability or extreme weather events. Variations in atmospheric circulation can influence temperature, precipitation, storm tracks, and the frequency of dry or wet periods.

In the North Atlantic region, the North Atlantic Oscillation (NAO) is an important source of climate variability. Changes in the pressure difference between the Azores High and the Icelandic Low influence the strength and position of the westerly winds and the tracks of extratropical cyclones. Other regions with oceanic climates can be influenced by large-scale climate patterns such as the El Niño–Southern Oscillation, the Pacific Decadal Oscillation, and the Southern Annular Mode.

The term "oceanic climate" therefore describes a long-term climatic regime rather than a particular type of daily weather. Individual years can include heat waves, cold spells, droughts and heavy precipitation.

== Precipitation and topography ==
Locations with oceanic climates tend to feature frequent cloudy conditions with precipitation, low-hanging clouds, and frequent fronts and storms. Thunderstorms are normally few, since strong daytime heating and hot and cold air masses meet infrequently in the regions, but are more common in subtropical highland climates where these air masses meet more frequently due to the influence of hotter weather in the subtropics or tropics, especially in monsoon-influenced climates. In most areas with an oceanic climate, precipitation comes in the form of rain for the majority of the year. Most oceanic climate zones, however, experience at least one snowfall per year. Snowfall is more frequent and commonplace in the subpolar oceanic climates due to the colder weather in those locations.

=== Topography ===
Topography can produce substantial variations within regions classified as having an oceanic climate. Moist maritime air rising over mountain ranges is cooled adiabatically, often producing increased precipitation on windward slopes. Areas located on the leeward side of mountain ranges may receive substantially less precipitation because of the rain-shadow effect. Consequently, locations with oceanic climates can have markedly different precipitation totals over relatively short distances. Elevation also reduces air temperature and can cause areas at higher elevations to experience cooler conditions than nearby lowland locations, including more frequent snowfall during winter.

== Temperature ==
=== Under the Köppen climate classification system ===
Overall temperature characteristics of the oceanic climates feature cool temperatures and infrequent extremes of temperature. In the Köppen climate classification, oceanic climates have a mean temperature of 0 °C (32 °F) or higher (or −3 °C (27 °F) or higher) in the coldest month, compared to continental climates where the coldest month has a mean temperature of below 0 °C (32 °F) (or −3 °C (27 °F)). Summers are warm but not hot, with the warmest month having a mean temperature below 22 °C (72 °F).

Poleward of the latter is a subtype of it, the subpolar oceanic climate (Köppen Cfc), with long but relatively mild (for their latitude) winters, and cool and short summers with average temperatures of at least 10 °C (50 °F) for one to three months. Examples in the Northern Hemisphere include parts of coastal Iceland, the mountains of Scotland, parts of Shetland, and the British Columbian coast in Canada. In the Southern Hemisphere, examples include extreme southern Chile and Argentina (such as Punta Arenas and Ushuaia), the Falkland Islands, parts of southeastern Australia, and much of New Zealand.

=== Under the Trewartha climate classification system ===
Oceanic climates are defined very differently under the Trewartha climate classification system.

In temperate areas, oceanic climates exist where four to seven months average at least 10 °C (50 °F) regardless of summer heat or lack thereof, so long as the coldest month averages at least 0 °C (32 °F). This allows some places with hot summers, such as New York City, the District of Columbia, and Louisville, Kentucky, to have oceanic climates under the Trewartha system, although these climates are considered humid subtropical under the Köppen system due to summer heat instead of the length of the growing season being the trigger for Köppen.

In boreal/subpolar areas, Trewartha defines areas like Anchorage that have winters averaging over −10 °C (14 °F) as oceanic climates even if they are insufficiently mild to be classified as oceanic under Köppen too like Reykjavík is, as opposed to the freezing isotherm used in temperate climates. Nonetheless, Köppen and Trewartha concur on the summer temperature of a subpolar climate, with one to three months averaging over 10 °C (50 °F) being the trigger for both.

== Locations ==
=== Europe ===
Amsterdam, Netherlands

Climate chart (precipitation, max. and min. temperature)
J	F	M	A	M	J	J	A	S	O	N	D
67 6 1	55 7 1	52 10 3	40 14 5	54 18 9	65 20 11	82 23 14	99 22 13	84 19 11	87 15 8	85 10 5	82 7 2
- █ Average max. and min. temperatures in °C
- █ Precipitation totals in mm
- Source: Royal Netherlands Meteorological Institute
Imperial conversion
J	F	M	A	M	J	J	A	S	O	N	D
2.6 43 34	2.2 44 34	2 50 37	1.6 58 41	2.1 64 47	2.6 69 52	3.2 73 56	3.9 72 56	3.3 67 52	3.4 58 46	3.4 50 40	3.2 44 35
- █ Average max. and min. temperatures in °F
- █ Precipitation totals in inches

Oceanic climates in Europe occupy a large stretch of land, from Norway, the British Isles and southeast to some parts of northern Turkey.

Western Europe is almost exclusively oceanic between 45°N to 54.913°N; including most of France (away from the Mediterranean), nearly all of Belgium, the Netherlands, Austria, most of Luxembourg, most of Denmark, western Germany, northwestern Switzerland, extreme southern Sweden, and Poland's immediate coastal cities, such as Gdynia.

While most of Southern Europe is climatically Mediterranean, some parts of Southern Europe (specifically in the northwestern part of the Iberian Peninsula) also have oceanic climates — which is the case of parts of Galicia, an autonomous community in Spain, including the province of A Coruña and its capital, the city of A Coruña.

However, these instances of the climate are highly variable, and often somewhat anomalous. For example, the western Azores off the coast of Portugal are too wet in summer to be Mediterranean, and too mild in summer to be humid subtropical, though they often have winter means above 9 °C (48 °F), unusual for European oceanic climates.

Another anomalous case can be found in northwestern Turkey, including northern Istanbul. These places are, in a strict air-mass sense, not oceanic: they are affected by southerlies directly from the Mediterranean, and polar intrusions from Siberia. Yet their position near the Black Sea makes them too wet in summer to be Mediterranean, too mild during winter to be humid continental, and not hot enough in summer to be humid subtropical; therefore Köppen classifies them as oceanic. Despite their anomalous position, however, their temperatures, around 4–5 °C (39–41 °F) in winter and 20–22 °C (68–72 °F) in summer, are not wholly atypical for European oceanic climates.

Some Eastern European regions such as the north of Croatia and Serbia and some parts of the Czech Republic, also have oceanic climates; these are generally near the boundary for being humid continental.

The line between oceanic and continental climates in Europe runs in a generally northwest to southeast direction. For example, western Germany is more impacted by milder Atlantic air masses than eastern Germany. Thus, winters across Europe become colder to the east, and (in some locations) summers become hotter. The line between oceanic Europe and Mediterranean Europe normally runs west to east and is related to changes in precipitation patterns and differences to seasonal temperatures; although intrusions of polar air, remnants of marine air-masses, and higher summer precipitation can create oceanic climates in Eastern Europe and transcontinental regions as far south as 40°N.

Under the Trewartha climate classification system, Milan also has a temperate oceanic climate despite its hot summers due to its insufficient growing season length to be considered subtropical. Tromsø has a boreal oceanic Eolo climate due to Trewartha's lower winter temperature threshold in subpolar climates compared to Köppen.

=== The Americas ===
Vancouver, Canada

Climate chart (precipitation, max. and min. temperature)
J	F	M	A	M	J	J	A	S	O	N	D
179 7 3	184 8 3	156 11 5	118 14 7	87 17 10	70 20 12	53 22 14	51 22 14	73 19 12	148 14 8	239 9 5	231 7 3
- █ Average max. and min. temperatures in °C
- █ Precipitation totals in mm
- Source: Environment Canada
Imperial conversion
J	F	M	A	M	J	J	A	S	O	N	D
7 44 37	7.2 47 38	6.1 51 40	4.6 56 44	3.4 62 49	2.8 67 54	2.1 72 57	2 72 58	2.9 66 53	5.8 57 47	9.4 49 41	9.1 44 37
- █ Average max. and min. temperatures in °F
- █ Precipitation totals in inches

The oceanic climate exists in an arc spreading across the northwestern coast of North America from the Alaskan panhandle to northern Washington. In addition, some east coast areas such as Block Island, Cape Cod, Martha's Vineyard, and Nantucket have a similar climate. And in the highlands of Central and South America with the variant Cfb. An extensive area of oceanic climates distinguishes the coastal regions of southern Chile and extends into bordering Argentina.

Under the Trewartha climate classification system, the oceanic climate zone is far more broad in North America, with many areas of the Mid-Atlantic States such as New York City, Philadelphia, the District of Columbia and Roanoke Va. being classified as temperate oceanic due to having insufficient growing seasons for a humid subtropical climate classification but winters too mild to be hot-summer humid continental climates. North American transition zone also extends west of the Appalachia to include cities such as Louisville, Murfreesboro, St. Louis and Wichita Kan.. Anchorage has a boreal oceanic Eolo climate due to Trewartha's lower winter temperature threshold in subpolar climates compared to Köppen.

=== Africa ===
The only noteworthy area of maritime climate at or near sea-level within Africa is in South Africa from Mossel Bay on the Western Cape coast to Plettenberg Bay (the Garden Route), with additional pockets of this climate inland of the Eastern Cape and KwaZulu-Natal coast. It is usually warm most of the year with no pronounced rainy season, but slightly more rain in autumn and spring. The Tristan da Cunha archipelago in the South Atlantic also has an oceanic climate.

=== Asia and Oceania ===
Christchurch, New Zealand

Climate chart (precipitation, max. and min. temperature)
J	F	M	A	M	J	J	A	S	O	N	D
37 23 12	41 22 12	41 20 10	55 18 7	56 15 5	61 12 2	57 11 1	51 13 3	36 15 4	49 17 6	41 19 8	52 21 11
- █ Average max. and min. temperatures in °C
- █ Precipitation totals in mm
- Source: CliFlo
Imperial conversion
J	F	M	A	M	J	J	A	S	O	N	D
1.5 73 53	1.6 72 53	1.6 69 49	2.2 64 44	2.2 58 40	2.4 53 35	2.2 53 34	2 55 37	1.4 59 39	1.9 62 42	1.6 67 46	2 70 51
- █ Average max. and min. temperatures in °F
- █ Precipitation totals in inches

Although oceanic climate is rare in Asia, subtropical highland climates and cold subtropical highland climates can be found in parts of Southwestern China, and the Himalayan regions of the northern Indian subcontinent.

The oceanic climate is prevalent in the more southerly parts of Oceania. A mild maritime climate is in existence in New Zealand. In Australia, the climate is found in Tasmania, southern half of Victoria and southeastern New South Wales (southwards from Wollongong).

The hinterland of the northern coast of Turkey, features this climate. Additionally, parts of the northeastern coast of Honshu, such as Mutsu, Aomori in Japan, feature this climate, which is rare in Asia due to the lack of a west coast in the middle latitudes.

Under the Trewartha climate classification system, numerous cities in northern Honshu in Japan have a hot-summer version of oceanic climates due to winters being too mild to be continental but growing seasons not being long enough to be subtropical, although the transition zone is narrower than it is in North America due to Japan's higher seasonal lag pushing November over the 10 °C (50 °F) threshold to be considered subtropical more readily. Examples of Japanese cities with a Doak climate include Sendai and some cooler neighborhoods in Niigata City. A similar transition zone exists in lowland regions of Mainland China, including Shangqiu and Pingdingshan.

=== Indian Ocean ===
Île Amsterdam and Île Saint-Paul, both part of the French Southern and Antarctic Lands, are located in the subtropics and have an oceanic climate (akin to Tristan da Cunha; see above).

== Varieties ==
=== Marine west coast (Cfb) ===
Cfb zone map 1991-2020

Plymouth, United Kingdom

Climate chart (precipitation, max. and min. temperature)
J	F	M	A	M	J	J	A	S	O	N	D
108 9 4	84 9 4	78 11 5	67 13 6	64 16 9	57 18 11	62 20 13	67 20 13	74 18 12	113 15 9	113 12 6	119 10 5
- █ Average max. and min. temperatures in °C
- █ Precipitation totals in mm
- Source: Hong Kong Observatory
Imperial conversion
J	F	M	A	M	J	J	A	S	O	N	D
4.3 48 39	3.3 48 38	3.1 51 41	2.6 55 43	2.5 60 48	2.2 64 52	2.4 68 56	2.6 68 56	2.9 65 53	4.4 59 49	4.4 53 44	4.7 49 40
- █ Average max. and min. temperatures in °F
- █ Precipitation totals in inches

Temperate oceanic climates, also known as "marine mild winter" climates or simply oceanic climates, are found either at middle latitudes. They are often found on or near the west coast of continents; hence another name for Cfb, "marine west coast climates". In addition to moderate temperatures year-round, one of the characteristics is the absence of a dry season. Except for Europe, this type of climate is confined to narrow bands of territory, largely in mid or high latitudes, although it can appear in elevated areas of continental terrain in low latitudes, e.g. plateaus in the subtropics. It exists in both hemispheres between 35° and 60°: at low altitudes between Mediterranean, humid continental, and subarctic climates.

Western sea breezes ease temperatures and moderate the winter, especially if warm sea currents are present, and cause cloudy weather to predominate. Precipitation is constant, especially in colder months, when temperatures are warmer than elsewhere at comparable latitudes. This climate can occur farther inland if no mountain ranges are present or nearby. As this climate causes sufficient moisture year-round without permitting deep snow cover, vegetation typically prospers in this climate. Deciduous trees are predominant in this climate region. However, conifers such as spruce, pine, and cedar are also common in a few areas, and fruits such as apples, pears, and grapes can often be cultivated here.

In the hottest month, the average temperature is below 22 °C (72 °F), and at least four months feature average temperatures higher than 10 °C (50 °F). The average temperature of the coldest month must not be colder than −3–0 °C (27–32 °F), or the climate will be classified as continental. The average temperature variations in the year are between 10–15 °C (50–59 °F), with average annual temperatures between 6–13 °C (43–55 °F). Rain values can vary from 50–500 cm (20–197 in), depending on whether mountains cause orographic precipitation. Frontal cyclones can be common in marine west coast regions, with some areas experiencing more than 150 rainy days annually, but strong storms are rare.

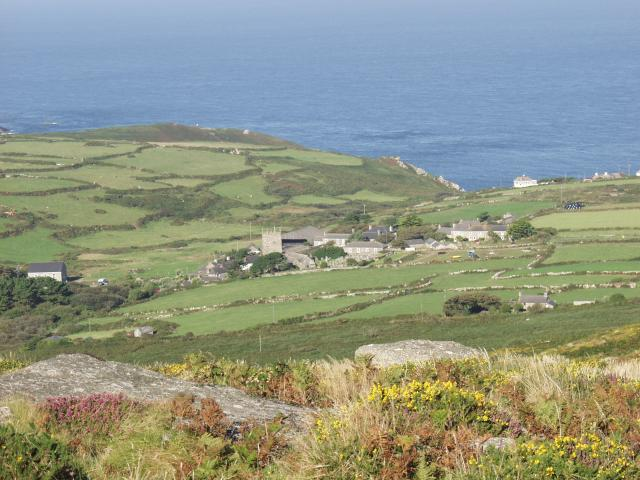
Zennor, United Kingdom

Cfb climates are predominant in most of Europe except the northeast, as the continental climate is more prominent further inland. They are the main climate type in New Zealand and the Australian states of Tasmania, Victoria, and southeastern New South Wales (starting from the Illawarra region). In North America, they are found mainly in Vancouver Island and neighbouring parts of British Columbia, as well as many coastal areas of southeast Alaska. There are pockets of this iteration of Cfb climates in South American countries, mostly in regions of southern Chile and Argentina, parts of the provinces of Chubut, Santa Cruz, and southeast Buenos Aires province in Argentina. In Western Asia, the climate can be found on the Black Sea coast of northern Turkey and Georgia, often transitional to humid subtropical. While Cfb zones are rare in Africa, one dominates the coastline of the Eastern Cape in South Africa.

The climate subtype can also be found in Nantucket, Massachusetts (in the immediate west and northwest in transition for humid continental, the remainder of Cape Cod) and the southern Appalachians (a highland alteration of the lowland's humid subtropical climate), both in the eastern United States. It is also found in the highest portions of the Brazilian state of Bahia and Roraima, the provinces of Sabah (northeastern Malaysia), and Baluchistan, Pakistan. Although there are more or less rare places associated with relatively isolated mountainous regions (e.g., North Oceania islands and China).

These climates are classified as Dobk under Trewartha if their growing seasons are not long enough for a humid subtropical climate.

=== Subtropical highland variety (Cfb, Cwb) ===
Bogotá, Colombia

Climate chart (precipitation, max. and min. temperature)
J	F	M	A	M	J	J	A	S	O	N	D
88 18 6	100 19 7	100 20 9	101 23 11	100 23 12	135 23 12	175 22 12	169 21 12	145 18 12	102 18 10	90 18 8	90 18 7
- █ Average max. and min. temperatures in °C
- █ Precipitation totals in mm
- Source: WMO
Imperial conversion
J	F	M	A	M	J	J	A	S	O	N	D
3.5 65 42	3.9 66 45	3.9 69 49	4 73 51	3.9 73 53	5.3 73 54	6.9 72 53	6.7 70 53	5.7 65 53	4 65 50	3.5 64 46	3.5 64 44
- █ Average max. and min. temperatures in °F
- █ Precipitation totals in inches

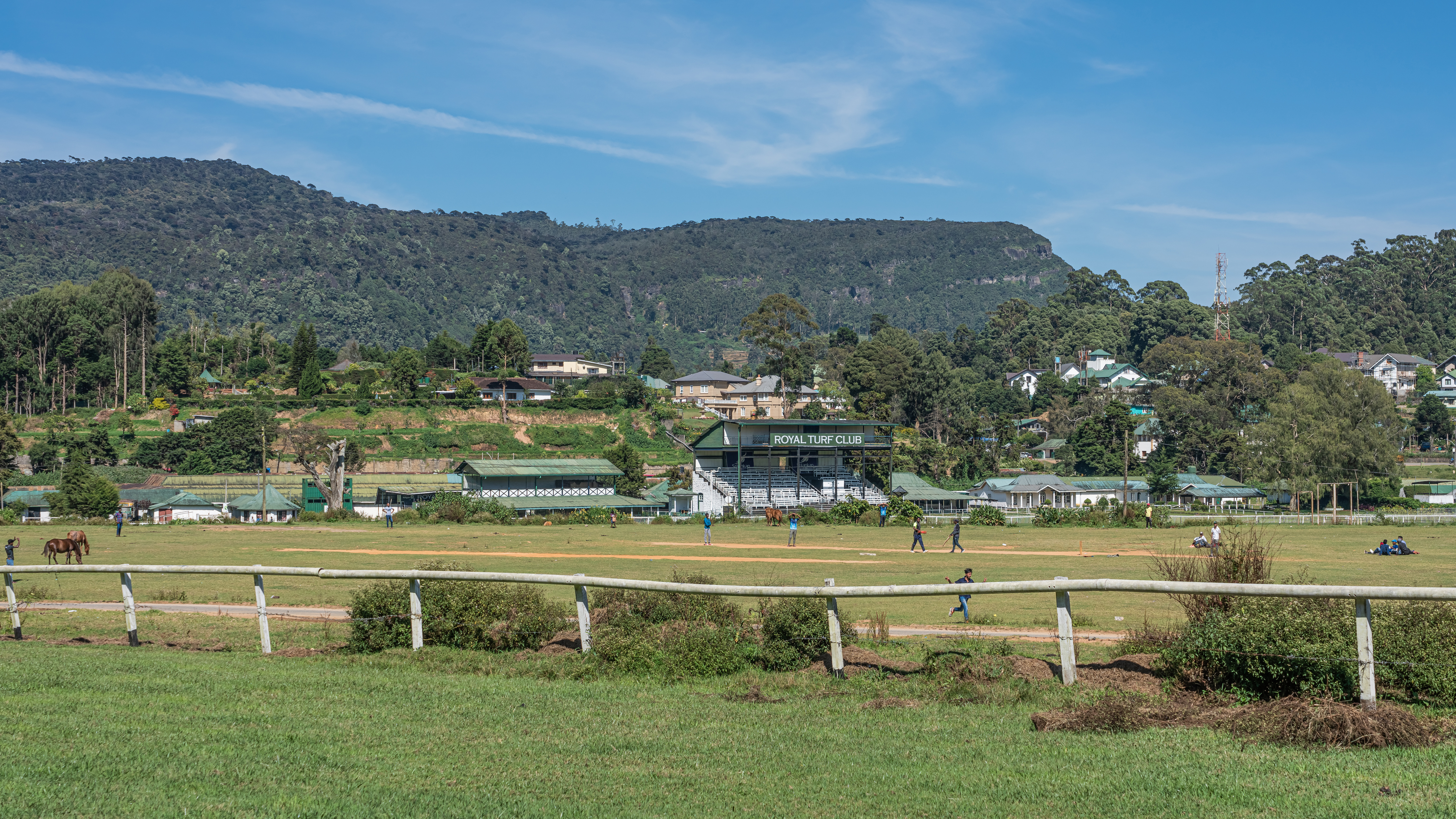
Nuwara Eliya, Sri Lanka

The subtropical highland climate is a climate variety, often grouped together with oceanic climates, which exists in some mountainous or elevated portions of the world in either the subtropics or tropics. Despite the latitude, the higher elevations of these regions mean that the climate shares characteristics with oceanic climates.

Subtropical highland climates with uniform rainfall (Cfb) usually have rainfall spread relatively evenly throughout the year, similar to other oceanic climates, but unlike these climates, they have a high diurnal temperature variation and low humidity, owing to their inland location and relatively high elevation. Subtropical highland climates with monsoon influence (Cwb) have distinctive wet summers and dry winters.

In locations outside the tropics, other than the drying trend in the winter, subtropical highland climates tend to be essentially identical to an oceanic climate, with mild summers and noticeably cooler winters, plus, in some instances, some snowfall. In the tropics, a subtropical highland climate typically features mild weather year-round. Temperatures there remain relatively constant throughout the year and snowfall is seldom seen due to warmer winters than most oceanic climates.

Areas with this climate feature monthly averages below 22 °C (72 °F) but above either 0 °C (32 °F) or −3 °C (27 °F) depending on isotherm used. At least one month's average temperature is below 18 °C (64 °F). Without their elevation, many of these regions would likely feature either humid subtropical or tropical climates.

This type of climate exists in parts of east, south and southeastern Africa, interior southern Africa and elevated portions of eastern Africa as far north as Ethiopia and of western Africa (west region of Cameroon) up to the southwestern Angola highlands. It also exists in the exposed areas of the High Atlas, some mountainous areas across southern Europe, and mountainous sections of North America, including parts of the southern Appalachians and the Central America Volcanic Arc. In South America, it can be found mainly in temperate mountainous areas in the Tropical Andes, the Venezuelan Coastal Range, the tepuis of the Guiana Shield, and due to variations in rainfall and temperature patterns in some places of the Tropical Andes in Bolivia, Perú, Ecuador, Colombia and Venezuela. Throughout Asia, most of Yunnan and the mountainous areas across Southeast Asia, parts of the Himalayas, parts of the Western Ghats, parts of Sri Lanka, and parts of the Hawaiian Islands of Maui and Hawaii experience the climate as well. In the Caribbean, only the peaks in the highest mountain ranges have this climate (including the Blue Mountains in Jamaica and Cerro Maravilla in Puerto Rico), with only Hispaniola's Cordillera Central and Chaîne de la Selle having significant urban settlements under this climate zone, such as cities like Kenscoff in Haiti and Constanza in the Dominican Republic.

These climates are classified as Dobk under Trewartha if their growing seasons are not long enough for a humid subtropical climate.

=== Subpolar oceanic and cold subtropical highland varieties (Cfc, Cwc) ===
Punta Arenas, Chile

Climate chart (precipitation, max. and min. temperature)
J	F	M	A	M	J	J	A	S	O	N	D
42 14 7	31 14 7	38 12 5	40 10 3	41 7 1	27 4 −1	29 4 −1	30 5 0	27 8 1	27 10 3	30 12 5	33 14 6
- █ Average max. and min. temperatures in °C
- █ Precipitation totals in mm
- Source: Dirección Meteorológica de Chile
Imperial conversion
J	F	M	A	M	J	J	A	S	O	N	D
1.6 58 44	1.2 57 44	1.5 54 41	1.6 49 38	1.6 44 34	1.1 39 30	1.1 39 30	1.2 41 32	1 46 34	1.1 50 37	1.2 54 40	1.3 56 43
- █ Average max. and min. temperatures in °F
- █ Precipitation totals in inches

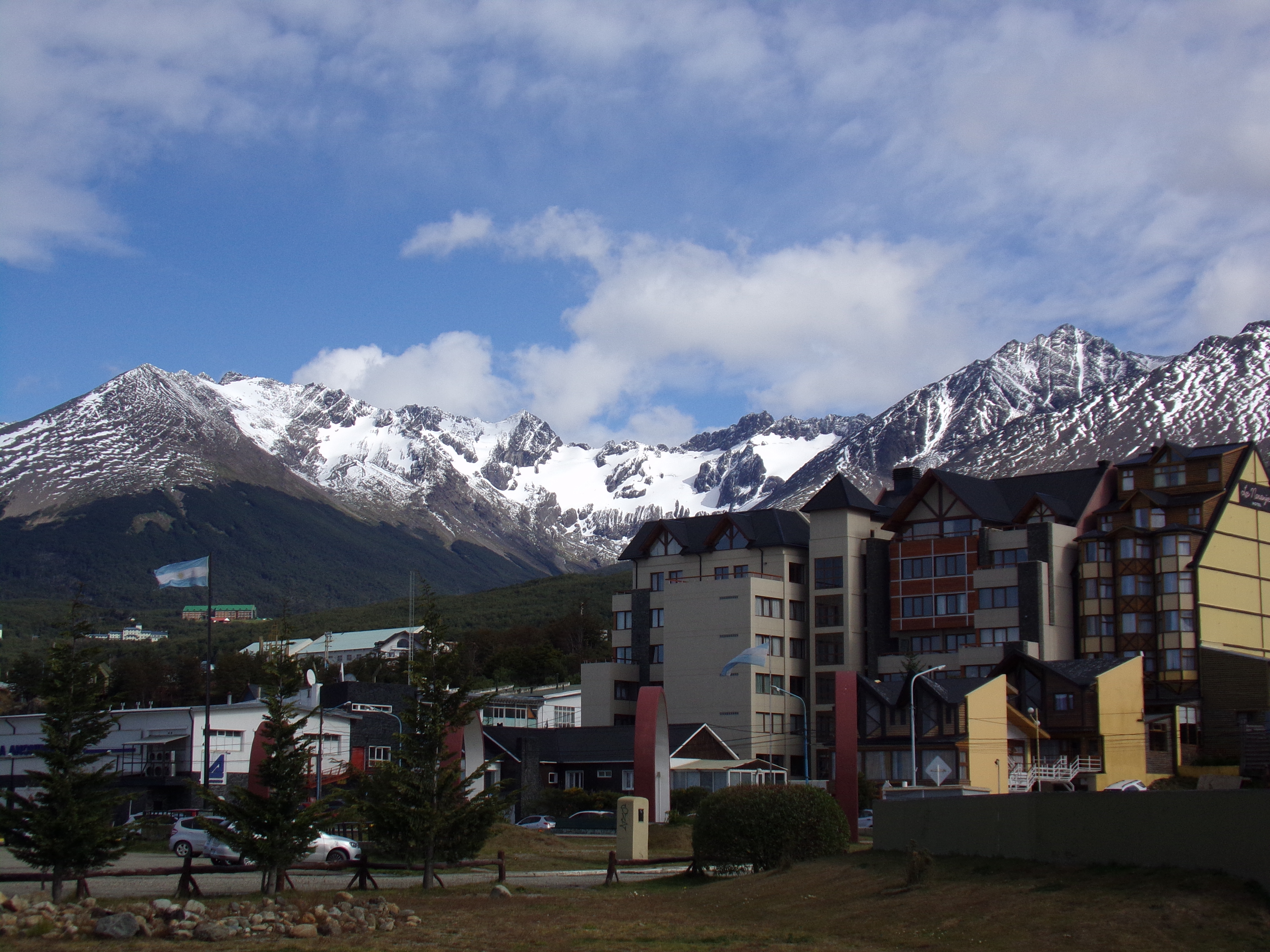
Ushuaia, Argentina

Areas with subpolar oceanic climates feature an oceanic climate but are usually located closer to polar regions, with long but relatively mild winters and short, cool summers. As a result of their location, these regions tend to be on the cool end of oceanic climates, approaching polar regions. Snowfall tends to be more common here than in other oceanic climates. Subpolar oceanic climates are less prone to temperature extremes than humid continental climates or subarctic climates, featuring milder winters than these climates. Subpolar oceanic climates feature only one to three months of average monthly temperatures of at least 10 °C (50 °F). As with oceanic climates, none of its average monthly temperatures fall below −3.0 °C (26.6 °F) or 0 °C (32 °F) depending on the isotherm used. It typically carries a Cfc designation, though very small areas in Argentina and Chile have summers sufficiently short to be Cwc with fewer than four months over 10 °C (50 °F).

This variant of an oceanic climate is found in parts of coastal Iceland, the Faroe Islands, upland/mountainous parts of Scotland and Northern England, uplands/highlands in Norway, the Aleutian Islands of Alaska and northern parts of the Alaskan Panhandle, the southwest of Argentina and Chile, and a few highland areas of Tasmania, and the Australian and Southern Alps. This type of climate is even found in very remote parts of the New Guinea Highlands. The classification used for this regime is Cfc. Temperatures above 30 °C (86 °F) and below −20 °C (−4 °F) are rare. In the most marine areas under this regime, temperatures above 20 °C (68 °F) are extreme weather events, even during summer.

Small areas in Yunnan, Sichuan; parts of Bolivia and Peru; and parts of Mount Kilimanjaro in Tanzania have summers sufficiently short to be Cwc with fewer than four months over 10 °C (50 °F). This is the cold variant of the monsoon-influenced subtropical highland climate. El Alto, Bolivia is one of the few confirmed cities that features this variation of a cold subtropical highland climate.

These climates are mostly classified as Eolk under Trewartha. However, a cold-winter Eolo variant including cities such as Anchorage and Tromsø also exists under Trewartha due to that system using a −10 °C (14 °F) winter isotherm specifically for boreal climates.

=== Hot-summer temperate oceanic climates ===
Although hot-summer climates with mild winters averaging above freezing are classified as humid subtropical climates under Köppen, some of these in areas with lukewarm springs and autumns are considered Doak climates under Trewartha due to their mediocre growing season length, with only four to seven months averaging above 10 °C (50 °F). This transition zone between unequivocally subtropical climates and hot-summer humid continental climates includes small areas in northern Honshu, some lowland areas of Mainland China, the city of Milan in Italy and some Mid-Atlantic and Upland Southern North American areas such as New York City, the District of Columbia, Louisville and St. Louis, even reaching into the Sun Belt in Murfreesboro and some Appalachian and Ozark plateau or mountain areas.

A variant also exists with at least one month averaging above 28 °C (82 °F); such climates are classified as Dohk. Examples include parts of northcentral Oklahoma such as Enid, parts of southeastern Turkey such as Diyarbakır and Şırnak and parts of western Iran such as Kermanshah.

== See also ==
- Temperate climate
- Humid temperate climate
- Subhumid temperate climate
- Mediterranean climate
- Köppen climate classification
- Trewartha climate classification
- Amann's Index of Hygrothermy
