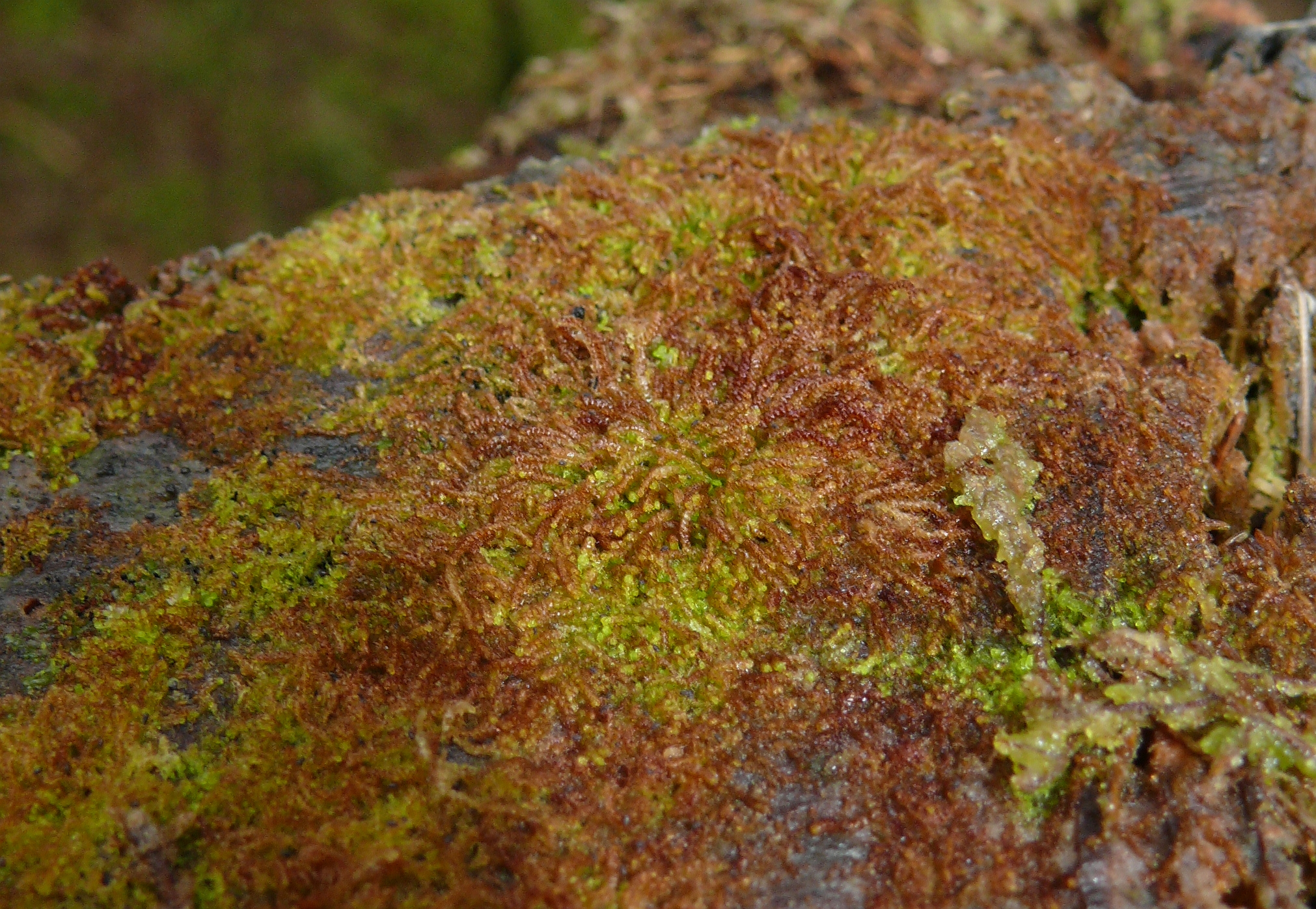
- Nowellia curvifolia

Scientific classification
- Kingdom: Plantae
- Division: Marchantiophyta
- Class: Jungermanniopsida
- Order: Lophoziales
- Family: Cephaloziaceae
- Genus: Nowellia; Mitt.

Species
- See text

= Nowellia =

Genus of liverworts

Nowellia is a genus of liverwort in the family Cephaloziaceae. The name of this genus is in honour of William Nowell (1880–1968), a British botanist and mycologist, who conducted researched in Trinidad and authored the book Diseases of crop-plants in the Lesser Antilles (1923).

== Species ==
Nowellia includes the following species, as accepted by GBIF:

- Nowellia aciliata (P.C.Chen & P.C.Wu) Mizut.
- Nowellia bicornis (Spruce) Fulford
- Nowellia borneensis (De Not.) Schiffn.
- Nowellia caledonica Stephani
- Nowellia caribbeania Fulford
- Nowellia curvifolia (Dicks.) Mitt.
- Nowellia dominicensis Steph.
- Nowellia evansii Grolle
- Nowellia indica Pandé & K.P.Srivast.
- Nowellia langii Pearson
- Nowellia orientalis R.S.Chopra
- Nowellia pusilla Grolle
- Nowellia reedii H.Rob.
- Nowellia wrightii Grolle
- Nowellia yunckeri Fulford
