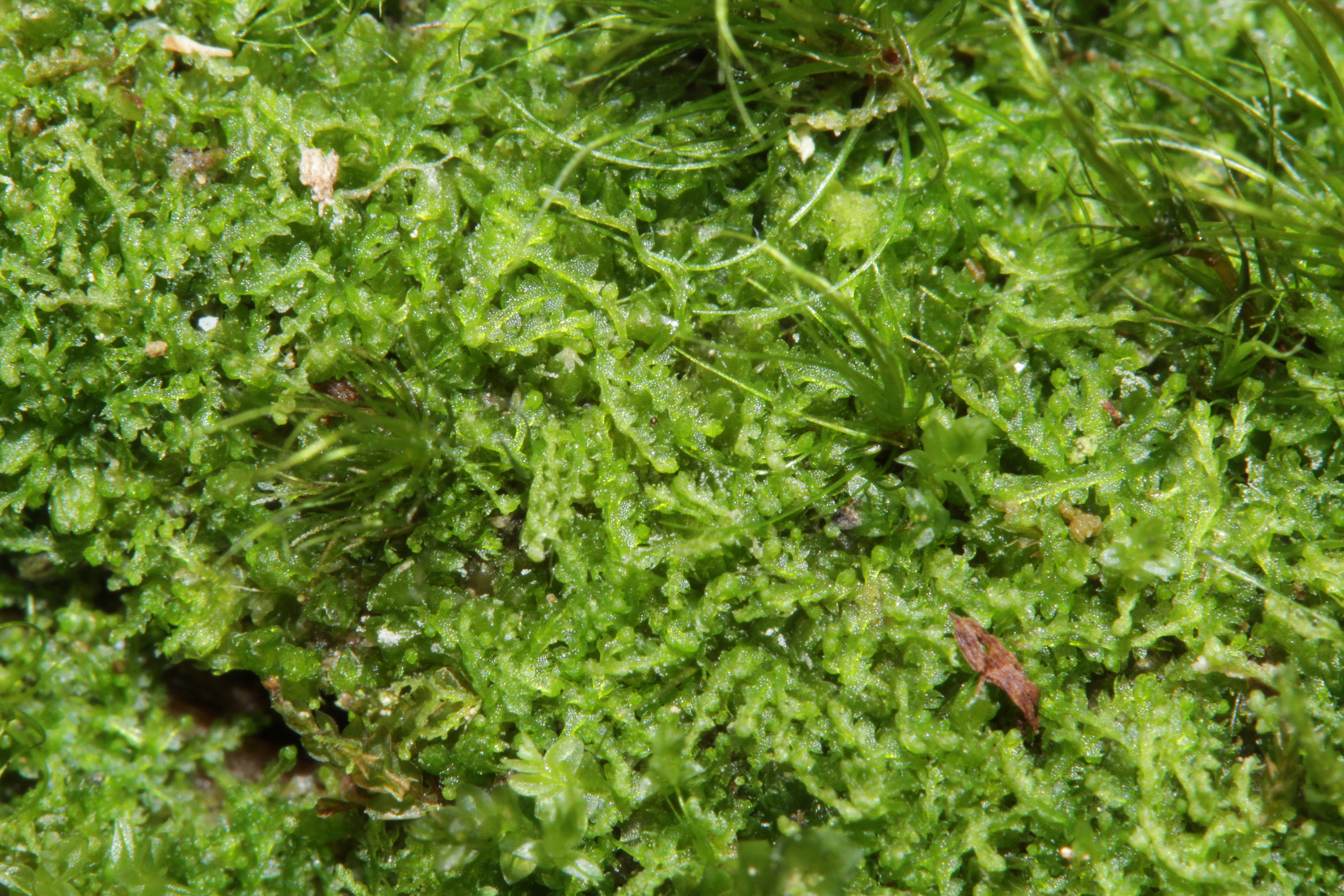
- Fuscocephaloziopsis lunulifolia

Scientific classification
- Kingdom: Plantae
- Division: Marchantiophyta
- Class: Jungermanniopsida
- Order: Lophoziales
- Family: Cephaloziaceae
- Genus: Fuscocephaloziopsis; Fulford

Species
- See text

= Fuscocephaloziopsis =

Genus of liverworts

Fuscocephaloziopsis is a genus of liverworts belonging to the family Cephaloziaceae. The genus has cosmopolitan distribution.

== Species ==
Fuscocephaloziopsis includes the follow species, as accepted by GBIF:

- Fuscocephaloziopsis affinis (Lindb. ex Steph.) Váňa & L.Söderstr.
- Fuscocephaloziopsis africana (Váňa) Váňa & L.Söderstr.
- Fuscocephaloziopsis albescens (Hook.) Váňa & L.Söderstr.
- Fuscocephaloziopsis baldwinii (C.M.Cooke) Váňa & L.Söderstr.
- Fuscocephaloziopsis biloba (Herzog) Fulford
- Fuscocephaloziopsis catenulata (Huebener) Váňa & L.Söderstr.
- Fuscocephaloziopsis connivens (Dicks.) Váňa & L.Söderstr.
- Fuscocephaloziopsis crassifolia (Lindenb. & Gottsche) Váňa & L.Söderstr.
- Fuscocephaloziopsis gollanii (Steph.) Váňa & L.Söderstr.
- Fuscocephaloziopsis leucantha (Spruce) Váňa & L.Söderstr.
- Fuscocephaloziopsis loitlesbergeri (Schiffn.) Váňa & L.Söderstr.
- Fuscocephaloziopsis lunulifolia (Dumort.) Váňa & L.Söderstr.
- Fuscocephaloziopsis macrostachya (Kaal.) Váňa & L.Söderstr.
- Fuscocephaloziopsis monticola (J.D.Godfrey) Váňa & L.Söderstr.
- Fuscocephaloziopsis pachycaulis (R.M.Schust.) Váňa & L.Söderstr.
- Fuscocephaloziopsis pachycaulis R.M.Schust
- Fuscocephaloziopsis pleniceps (Austin) Váňa & L.Söderstr.
- Fuscocephaloziopsis pulvinata (Steph.) Fulford
- Fuscocephaloziopsis schusteri (Sushil K.Singh & D.K.Singh) Váňa
- Fuscocephaloziopsis subintegra Gradst. & Váňa
- Fuscocephaloziopsis zoopsioides (Horik.) Váňa & L.Söderstr.
