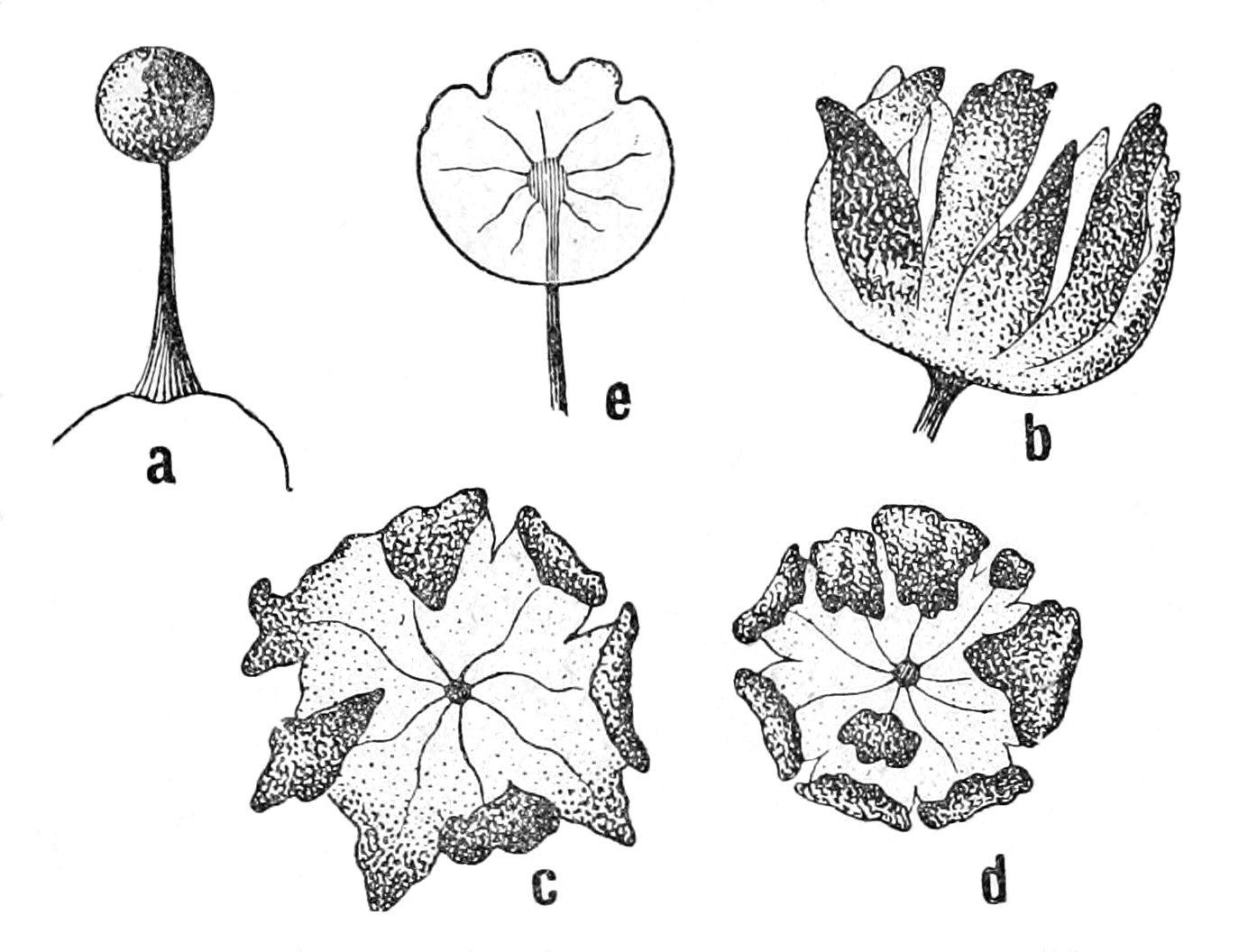
- life cycle of Barbeyella minutissima. A) Sporangium; b) through e) open sporangium; b) from the side; c) and d) from above; e) transparent peridium

Scientific classification
- Domain: Eukaryota
- Phylum: Amoebozoa
- Class: Myxogastria
- Order: Echinosteliales
- Family: Clastodermataceae; Alexop. & T.E.Brooks

Type genus
- Clastoderma Blytt

Genera
- Barbeyella; Clastoderma

= Clastodermataceae =

Family of slime moulds

The Clastodermataceae are a family of slime molds in the order Echinosteliales. The family was circumscribed in 1971. The family contains two genera, Barbeyella and Clastoderma.
