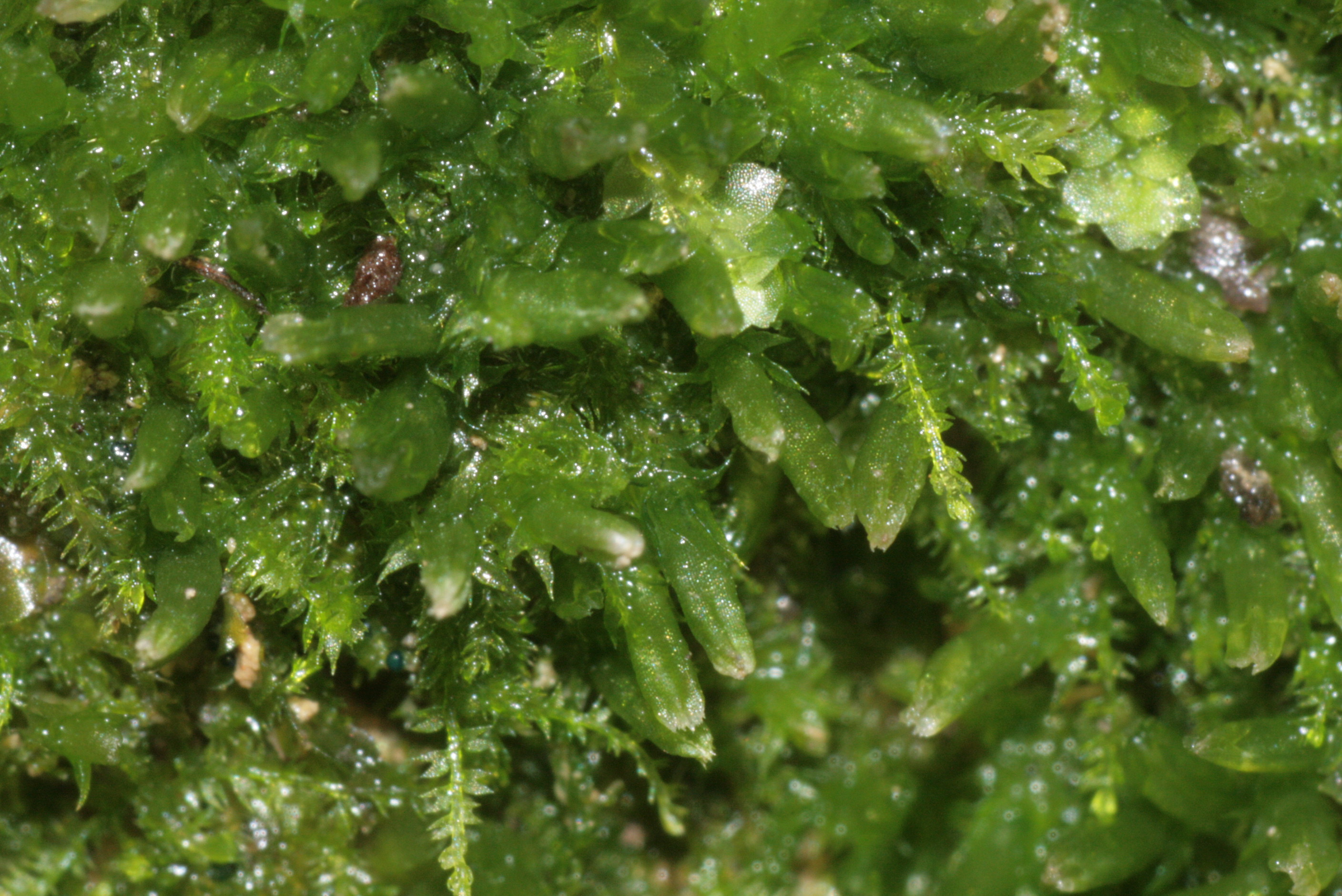
- Cephalozia bicuspidata

Scientific classification
- Kingdom: Plantae
- Division: Marchantiophyta
- Class: Jungermanniopsida
- Order: Lophoziales
- Family: Cephaloziaceae
- Genus: Cephalozia (Dumort.) Dumort.

= Cephalozia =

Genus of liverworts

Cephalozia is a genus of liverworts belonging to the family Cephaloziaceae.

The genus was first described by Barthélemy Charles Joseph du Mortier.

The genus has cosmopolitan distribution.

== Species ==
As accepted by GBIF (2023);

- Cephalozia acuminata (Herzog) Váňa
- Cephalozia acutiloba (Inoue) Váňa
- Cephalozia albula Steph.
- Cephalozia ambigua C.Massal.
- Cephalozia argentea (Hook.f. & Taylor) Spruce
- Cephalozia armata Stephani
- Cephalozia austrigena R.M.Schust. ex J.J.Engel
- Cephalozia badia (Gottsche) Steph.
- Cephalozia bicuspidata (L.) Dumort.
- Cephalozia bischlerae Fulford
- Cephalozia boschiana (Sande Lac.) Spruce
- Cephalozia caribbeania Fulford
- Cephalozia cavifolia S.W.Arnell
- Cephalozia ceratophylla Spruce
- Cephalozia chilensis (J.J.Engel & R.M.Schust.) R.M.Schust.
- Cephalozia conchata (Grolle & Váňa) Váňa
- Cephalozia crassicaulis Stephani
- Cephalozia crassifolia (Lindenb. & Gottsche) Fulford
- Cephalozia crossii Spruce
- Cephalozia cucullifolia Stephani
- Cephalozia darjeelingensis Udar & D.Kumar
- Cephalozia densa Pearson
- Cephalozia drucei (R.M.Schust.) Váňa
- Cephalozia dubia S.Hatt.
- Cephalozia dussii Fulford
- Cephalozia elachista (J.B.Jack ex Gottsche & Rabenh.) Lindb.
- Cephalozia ephemeroides Spruce
- Cephalozia extensa (Dumort.) Trevis.
- Cephalozia fornicata Spruce
- Cephalozia frondiformis (Spruce) Spruce
- Cephalozia fuegiensis Váňa
- Cephalozia grandifolia Steph.
- Cephalozia hamatiloba Steph.
- Cephalozia hians Steph.
- Cephalozia indica Udar & D.Kumar
- Cephalozia infuscata R.M.Schust.
- Cephalozia kashyapii Udar
- Cephalozia kodaikanalensis G.Asthana & Saumya Srivast.
- Cephalozia lacinulata (J.B.Jack ex Gottsche & Rabenh.) Spruce
- Cephalozia ligulata (Stephani) Besch.
- Cephalozia lucens (A.Evans) Steph.
- Cephalozia lycopodioides Sim
- Cephalozia macgregorii (Steph.) Váňa
- Cephalozia macounii (Austin) Austin
- Cephalozia macrostipa Stephani
- Cephalozia maxima Steph.
- Cephalozia mollusca (De Not.) Váňa
- Cephalozia monodactyla Spruce
- Cephalozia montana Horik.
- Cephalozia neesiana Steph.
- Cephalozia nishimurae (N.Kitag.) Váňa
- Cephalozia ochiajana Stephani
- Cephalozia otaruensis Stephani
- Cephalozia pachycaulis R.M.Schust.
- Cephalozia pachygyna R.M.Schust. ex J.J.Engel
- Cephalozia pandei Udar & D.Kumar
- Cephalozia patagonica Fulford
- Cephalozia physocaula (Hook.f. & Taylor) Steph.
- Cephalozia pygmaea Spruce
- Cephalozia robusta Stephani
- Cephalozia sanctae-helenae M.Wigginton
- Cephalozia sandvicensis (Mont.) Spruce
- Cephalozia schusteriana J.J.Engel
- Cephalozia serra Spruce
- Cephalozia setulosa (Leitg.) Spruce
- Cephalozia stolonacea (Herzog) Váňa
- Cephalozia subforficata Herzog
- Cephalozia terminalis S.Hatt.
- Cephalozia tricuspidata (Nees) Trevis.
- Cephalozia tubulata (Hook.f. & Taylor) Trevis.
- Cephalozia turgida Carrington ex Spruce
- Cephalozia vaginans (Stephani) Stephani
- Cephalozia veltenii T.Katag.
- Cephalozia venezuelana R.M.Schust.
- Cephalozia virginiana Spruce
- Cephalozia vulcanicola Stephani
