= Charles Meylan =

Swiss botanist

Charles Meylan (23 June 1868, Le Brassus – 3 June 1941, Sainte-Croix) was a Swiss botanist.

From 1888 to 1926 he was a schoolteacher in the community of La Chaux, located near Sainte-Croix (Canton of Vaud). In 1922 he obtained an honorary doctorate from the University of Lausanne. He made contributions in the fields of lichenology and bryology (mosses and liverworts), and is also known for his research of Myxomycetes.

Taxa with the specific epithet of meylanii honor him, two examples being Calypogeia meylanii and Hymenostomum meylanii.

== Published works ==
He was the author of 80 published works. With Jules Amann and Paul Frédéric Culmann, he was co-author of Flore des mousses de la Suisse (1912). In 1924 he published a book on Swiss liverworts, titled Les hépatiques de la Suisse and in 1940, at the age of 72, he published Les Muscinées du Parc National Suisse (Mosses from the Swiss National Park.
