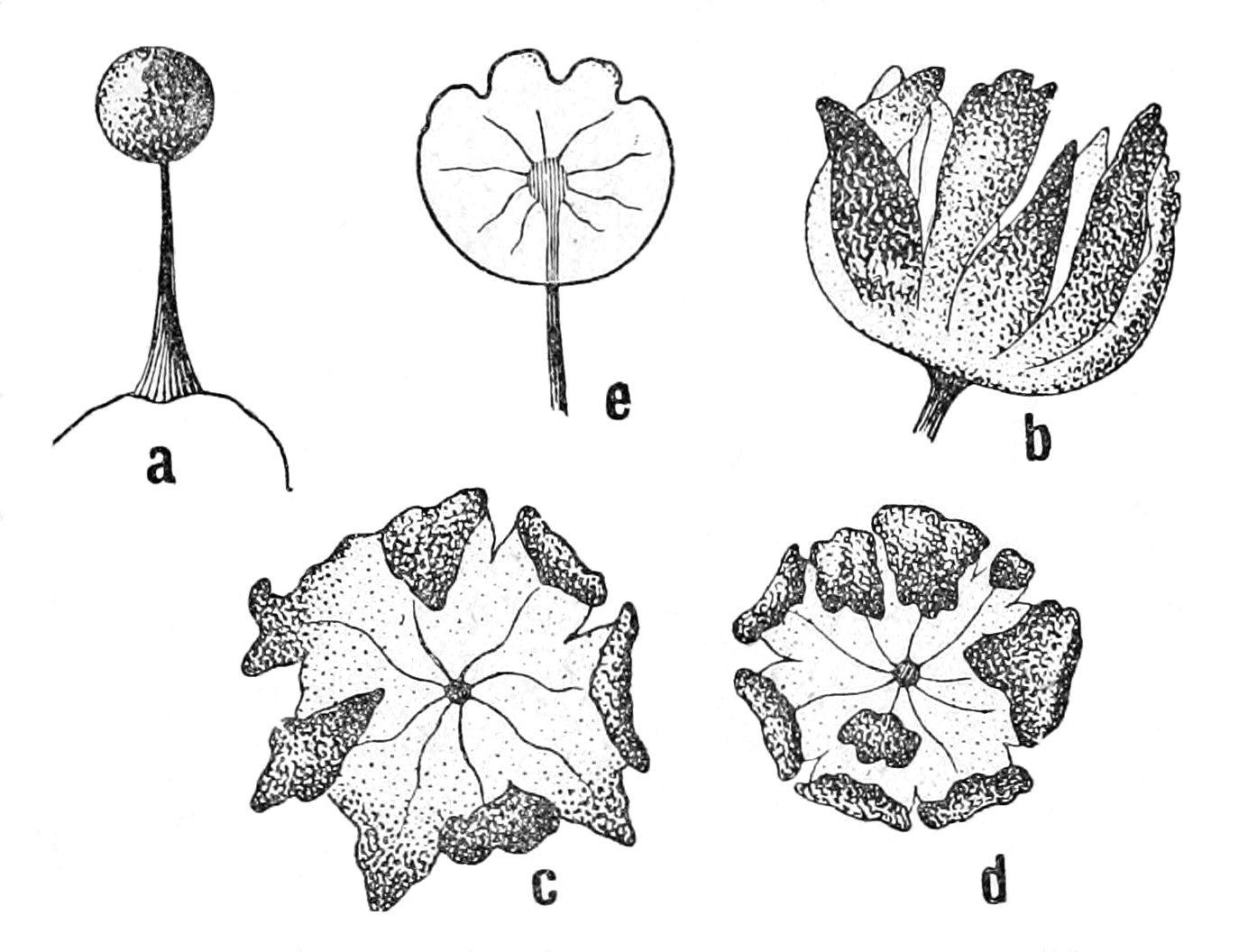
- life cycle of Barbeyella minutissima. A) Sporangium; b) through e) open sporangium; b) from the side; c) and d) from above; e) transparent peridium

Scientific classification
- Domain: Eukaryota
- Phylum: Amoebozoa
- Infraphylum: Eumycetozoa
- Class: Myxogastria
- Order: Echinosteliales; G.W.Martin, 1961

Families
- Clastodermataceae; Echinosteliaceae

= Echinosteliales =

Order of slime moulds

The Echinosteliales are an order of Amoebozoa in the class Myxomycetes. It contains two families, the Clastodermataceae and the Echinosteliaceae. Echinosteliales was circumscribed by George Willard Martin and published in 1961.
