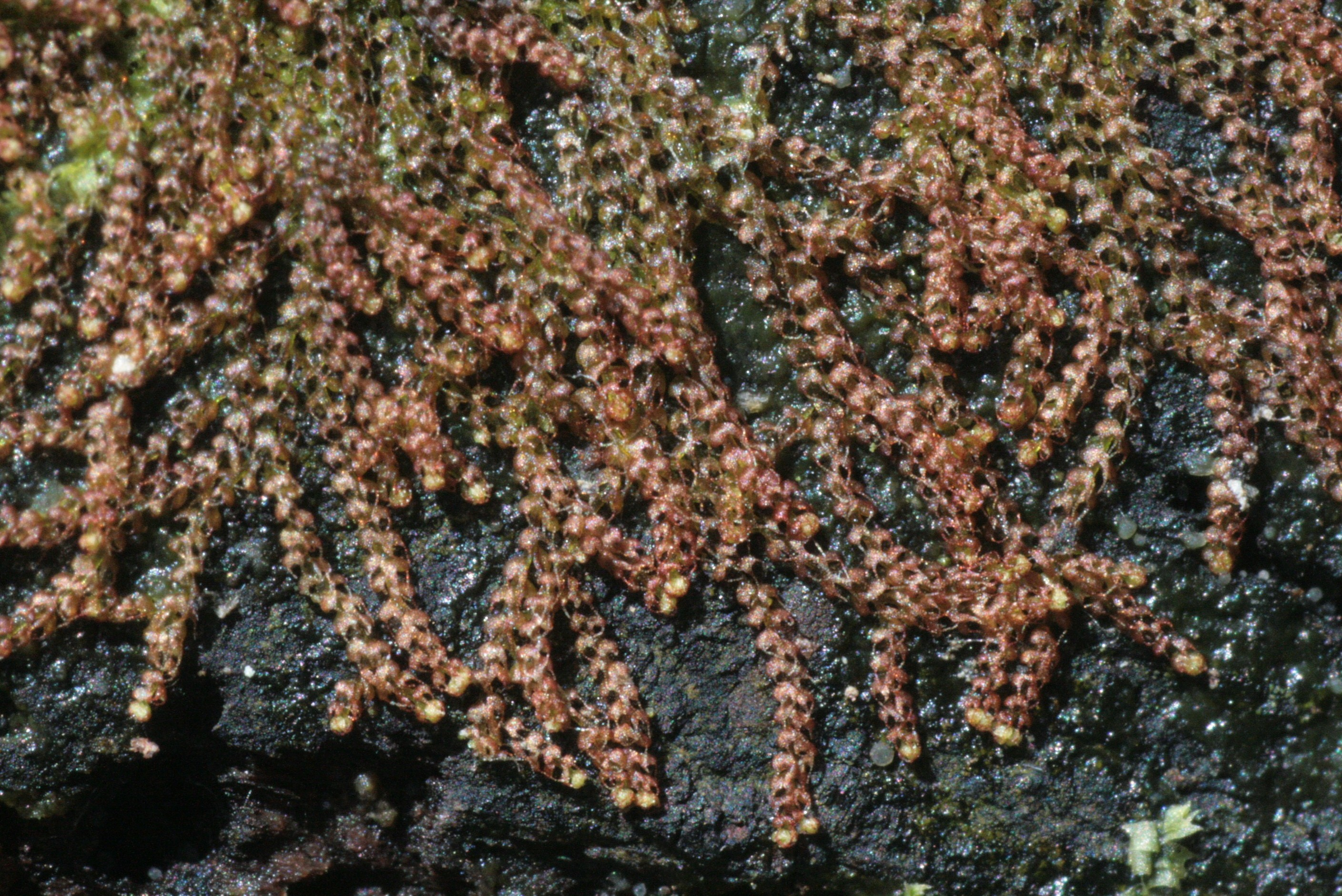
- Nowellia curvifolia

Scientific classification
- Kingdom: Plantae
- Division: Marchantiophyta
- Class: Jungermanniopsida
- Order: Lophoziales
- Family: Cephaloziaceae; Mig.

Genera
- 13 to 16, see text

= Cephaloziaceae =

Family of liverworts

Cephaloziaceae is a family of liverworts.

Liverworts of this family are dioecious plants which have creeping or upright forms. They are green, brown, reddish, or purplish in color. The leaves are alternately arranged and succubous. Oil bodies are rare. They reproduce sexually, or vegetatively via gemmae.

== Subfamilies and genera ==
Subfamilies and genera of Cephaloziaceae

- Alobielloideae R.M.Schust.
  - Alobiella (Spruce) Schiffn.
  - Alobiellopsis R.M.Schust.
- Cephalozioideae Müll.Frib.
  - Cephalozia Dumort.) Dumort.
  - Fuscocephaloziopsis Fulford
  - Nowellia Mitt.
- Odontoschismatoideae H.Buch ex Grolle
  - Odontoschisma (Dumort.) Dumort.
- Schiffnerioideae R.M.Schust.
  - Schiffneria Steph.
- Trabacelluloideae R.M.Schust.
  - Haesselia Grolle & Gradst.
  - Trabacellula Fulford

Family Cephaloziaceae is frequently rearranged. For example, genetic analysis suggests that genus Hygrobiella should be moved out of the family, and perhaps classified in a family of its own, and microscopic analysis of the morphology of Trabacellula also suggests it should be separated and made into a new family.
