= Talsi rolling hills =

Nature park in Latvia

Talsi Hillock Nature Park
- IUCN category II (national park)
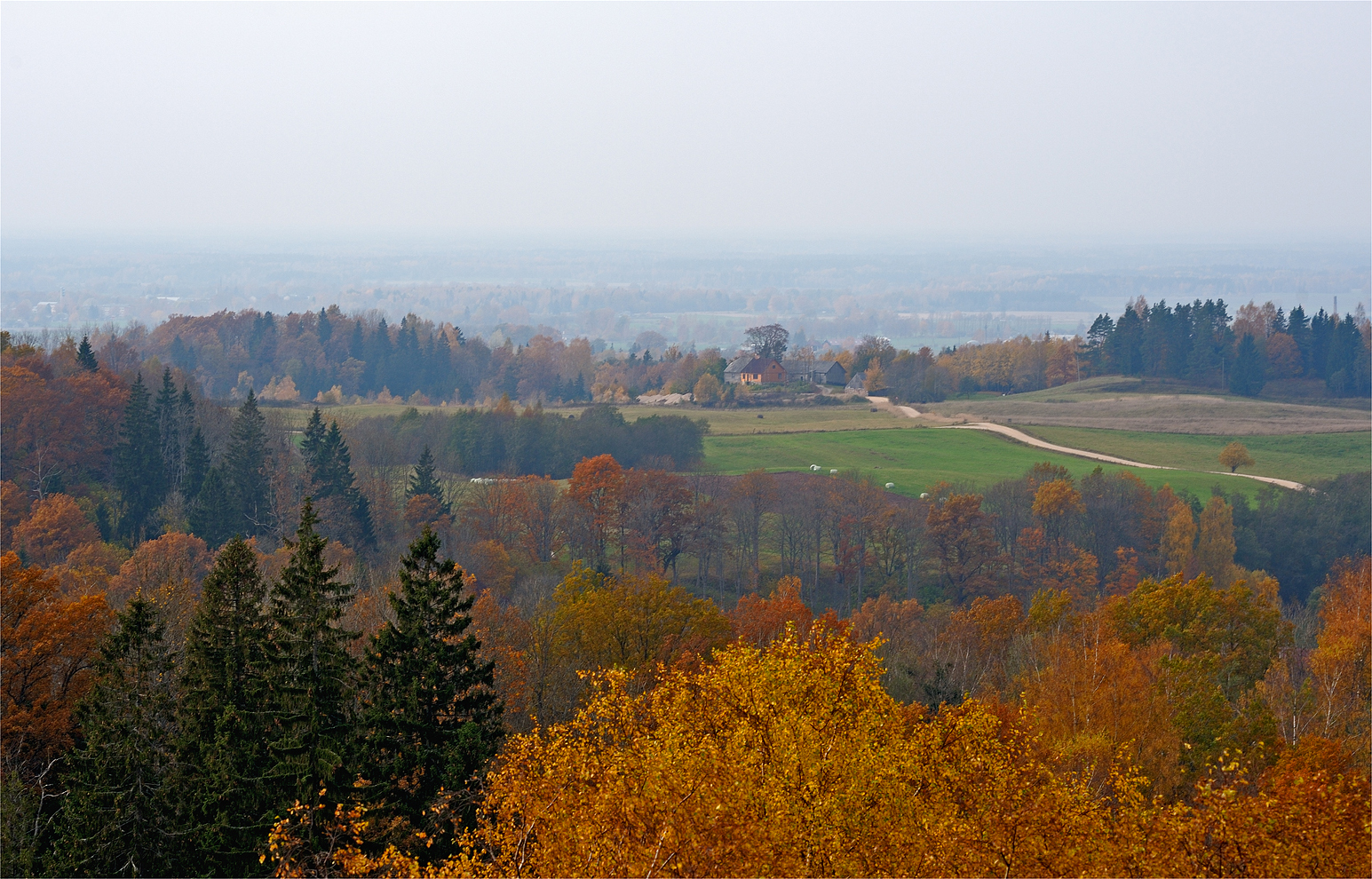
- Talsi rolling hills. View from Kamparkalns.

- Location within Latvia
- Location: Latvia, Kurzeme, Talsi Municipality
- Nearest city: Talsi
- Coordinates: 57°14′23″N 22°40′32″E
- Area: 36.25 km^{2} (14.00 sq mi)
- Established: 1987
- Website: www.talsupauguraine.lv/en/

Talsi rolling hills (Latvian: Talsu pauguraine) is a nature park in the middle of Talsi Municipality. It is located in the north-western part of Vanemas pauguraine and includes the highest part, administratively belongs to Laidzes, Laucienes and Lībagu parishes. The protected area was established in 1987 to protect one of the North Kurzeme Uplands and highest part of the Elder Hill. It is most diverse areas in terms of natural conditions in the Latvia north-east, with a distinctly hilly terrain and several small but deep lakes. Scenic area. Natura 2000 territory. Many Latvia rare and protected plant and animal species. In total 24 species of flora (1) and fauna (23) are protected under EU Nature directives.

== Flora ==
Coniferous forests and mixed forests cover 52% of the territory of Talsi Hillock Nature Park. Among the protected plant species are cinclidium moss (Cinclidium stygium), Hamatocaulis moss (Hamatocaulis vernicosus), conecap moss (Hygroamblystegium tenax), forked veilwort (Metzgeria furcata), Irish ruffwort (Moerckia hibernica), angled paludella moss (Paludella squarrosa), thick-nerved apple-moss (Philonotis calcarea), wavy-leaved cotton moss (Plagiothecium undulatum), fringed heartwort (Ricciocarpos natans), Muehlenbeck's grimmia moss (Grimmia muehlenbeckii), lesser hairy-brome (Bromus benekenii). As well as toothwort (Cardamine), common spotted orchid (Dactylorhiza fuchsii), Baltic broad-leaved marsh orchid (Dactylorhiza majalis subsp. baltica), heath spotted-orchid (Dactylorhiza maculata), early marsh orchid (Dactylorhiza incarnata), fragrant orchid (Gymnadenia conopsea), Northern firmoss (Huperzia selago), broad-leaved sermountain (Laserpitium latifolium), black pea (Lathyrus niger), fen orchid (Liparis loeselii), alternate water-milfoil (Myriophyllum alterniflorum), common clubmoss (Lycopodium clavatum), stiff clubmoss (Spinulum annotinum), sandy esparcet (Onobrychis arenaria), bird's-eye primrose (Primula farinosa), suckling clover (Trifolium dubium), swamp violet (Viola uliginosa), leatherleaf rose (Rosa coriifolia), soft downy rose (Rosa mollis), common butterwort (pinguicula vulgaris), tall broomrape (Orobanche elatior), greater butterfly-orchid (Platanthera chlorantha), lesser butterfly-orchid (Platanthera bifolia) and early purple orchid (Orchis mascula).

One of the species of mosses and liverworts - Hamatocaulis vernicosus is protected under EU Nature directives.

== Fauna ==
Protected birds are lesser spotted eagle (Clanga pomarina), European honey buzzard (Pernis apivorus), Hazel grouse (Tetrastes bonasia), corn crake (Crex crex), white-backed woodpecker (Dendrocopos leucotos), middle spotted woodpecker (Dendrocoptes medius), black woodpecker (Dryocopus martius), Eurasian three-toed woodpecker (Picoides tridactylus), grey-headed woodpecker (Picus canus), Eurasian pygmy owl (Glaucidium passerinum), Eurasian crane (Grus grus), red-backed shrike (Lanius collurio), wood lark (Lullula arborea), white stork (Ciconia ciconia) and black stork (Ciconia nigra).

Of the invertebrates beetles Dytiscus latissimus, Graphoderus bilineatus and dragonflies large white-faced darter (Leucorrhinia pectoralis), hermit beetle (Osmoderma eremita), Stenocorus meridianus, Saperda perforata, six spotted longhorn beetle (Anoplodera sexguttata), Protaetia lugubris, Geyer's whorl snail (Vertigo geyeri), narrow-mouthed whorl snail (Vertigo angustior), Roman snail (Helix pomatia), two-toothed door snail (Clausilia bidentata), shining ram's-horn snail (Segmentina nitida), Lilypad whiteface (Leucorrhinia caudalis), dark whiteface (Leucorrhinia albifrons), European medicinal leech (Hirudo medicinalis), purple Emperor (Apatura iris), Eurasian white admiral (Limenitis camilla), clouded Apollo (Parnassius mnemosyne) and Old World swallowtail (Papilio machaon).

Lakes and their surroundings are suitable habitats for bats: pond bat (Myotis dasycneme), common noctule (Nyctalus noctula), Nathusius' pipistrelle (Pipistrellus nathusii), northern bat (Eptesicus nilssonii), Daubenton's bat (Myotis daubentonii), brown long-eared bat (Plecotus auritus).

And also northern birch mouse (Sicista betulina), Eurasian beaver (Castor fiber), European pine marten (Martes martes), mountain hare (Lepus timidus) and hazel dormouse (Muscardinus avellanarius). Eurasian otter (Lutra lutra) also live in the protected area.

In total :

- 15 species of birds are protected under EU Nature directives.
- 6 species of invertebrates are protected under EU Nature directives.
- 2 species of mammals are protected under EU Nature directives.
