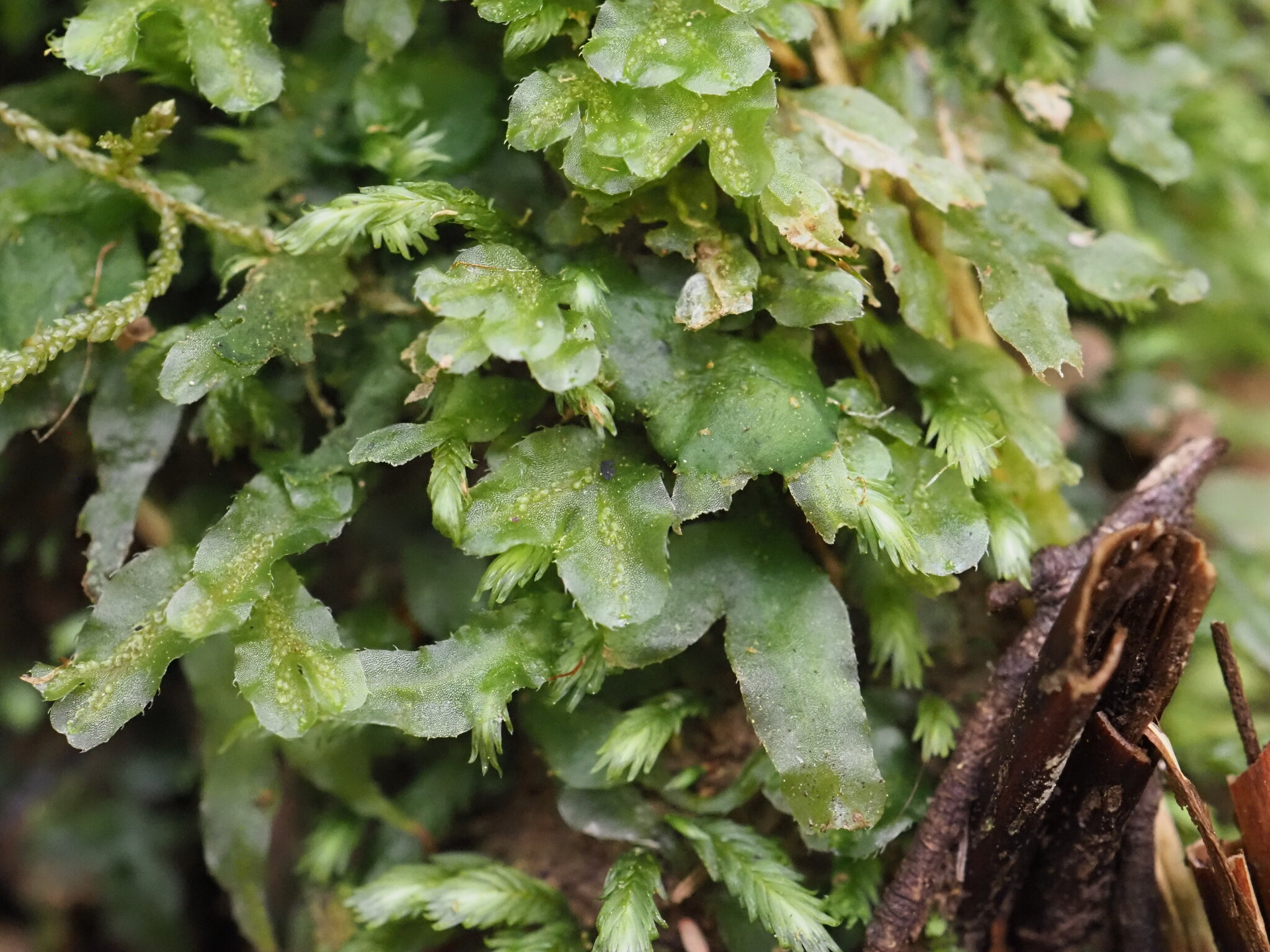

Scientific classification
- Kingdom: Plantae
- Division: Marchantiophyta
- Class: Jungermanniopsida
- Order: Pallaviciniales
- Family: Pallaviciniaceae
- Genus: Symphyogyna
- Species: S. podophylla

Binomial name
- Symphyogyna podophylla Thunb.
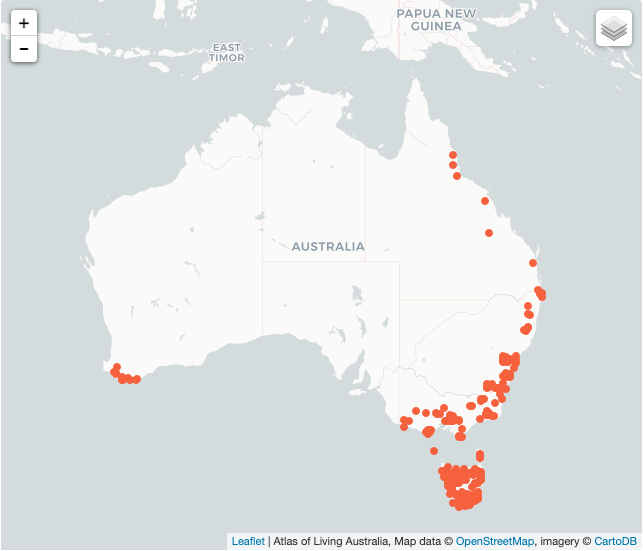
- Distribution map of Symphyogyna podophylla (Symphyogyna hymenophyllum) in Australia

Synonyms
- Symphyogyna hymenophyllum

= Symphyogyna podophylla =

Liverwort species

Symphyogyna podophylla (also known as Symphyogyna hymenophyllum) is a dendroid liverwort which is widespread in wet forests. It occurs in New Zealand, South America, Southern Africa, and is very common in wet forests of Australia and Tasmania.

It has an erect brownish stalk with a flat frond structure; it closely resembles a different liverwort species, Hymenophyton flabellatum. It can be distinguished from H. flabellatum by the marginal teeth on its thalloid lobes, and the positions of its sex organs.

This dendroid, thalloid liverwort is characterised by its palmate, 'fan-like' fronds which arise from its distinct brown stalk which is up to 2cm tall. The stalk arises from a rhizome, which utilises rhizoids to attach to soil substrate. Fronds are commonly flat and forked forming a triangular shape. The frond typically divides into two segments which can divide into two again. Forks may be scarce, or not occur at all, however this is rare. The frond can also occasionally be prostrate. Variability in thickness of the lamina can influence its appearance, it can be thin and translucent, or thick and opaque. The frond is generally <1cm, with segments approximately 2mm wide. Segments of the frond have toothed margins, and can be reddish-brown (this can sometimes be true for the entire plant). If an individual's margins are irregularly lobed or not well-developed, it can be mistaken for species of the genus Podomitrium.

Male plants of this species are smaller and less branched, with small scales along the centre of the thallus covering antheridia, while female plants have one or two scales covering archegonia, and produce sporophytes which are encased in a white, fleshy tube. The sporophyte has a reddish shoot-calyptra, up to 1cm long; the capsule is <5mm long with valves which can remain together at their tips after dehiscence.

== Habitat and distribution ==
Most commonly found in wet sclerophyll forest, but is also found in rainforest, fern gullies, and on occasion, dry sclerophyll forest. It can occur in drier habitats where conditions allow, in shady, moist areas such as banks of permanent streams.

It is found in Southern African countries such as South Africa, and South American countries such as Argentina, and it is widespread in wet forests of New Zealand. It is a common plant in Tasmanian wet sclerophyll forest and rainforest, growing in many areas where it has adequate substrate.

== Naming and species delineation ==
The species is accepted as Symphyogyna hymenophyllum as well as Symphyogyna podophylla, these are frequently used synonymously, however it is listed in the Tropicos botanical database as Symphyogyna podophylla. It was found that while the species are very similar in morphological habit, they are distinct, in terms of spore ornamentation and phytochemistry, and in morphological differences which can be seen when they are observed carefully in their habitats; S. podophylla has smaller fronds which fork less.These differences occur based on location; the New Zealand species of S. podophylla is distinct to the species of S. hymenophyllum found in Australia and South Africa. In phytochemical tests, Tasmanian, South African and Argentinian specimens had highly similar phenolic content, and similar spores; each was distinct to the New Zealand samples. This has led to the conclusion that New Zealand's S. podophylla is a different species to S. hymenophyllum.
