= Symphyogyna brongniartii =

Scientific classification
- Kingdom: Plantae
- Division: Marchantiophyta
- Class: Jungermanniopsida
- Order: Pallaviciniales
- Family: Pallaviciniaceae
- Genus: Symphyogyna
- Species: S. brongniartii

Binomial name
- Symphyogyna brongniartii Mont.

Species of liverwort

Symphyogyna brongniartii is a species of liverwort belonging to the family Pallaviciniaceae.

A study in tropical Ecuador found that Symphyogyna brongniartii was typically not found in urban environments despite being found in a nearby pristine location, suggesting that the species is sensitive to anthropogenic effects such as the presence of wastewater and heavy metal pollution. The closely related Symphyogyna brasiliensis showed the same distribution pattern.
