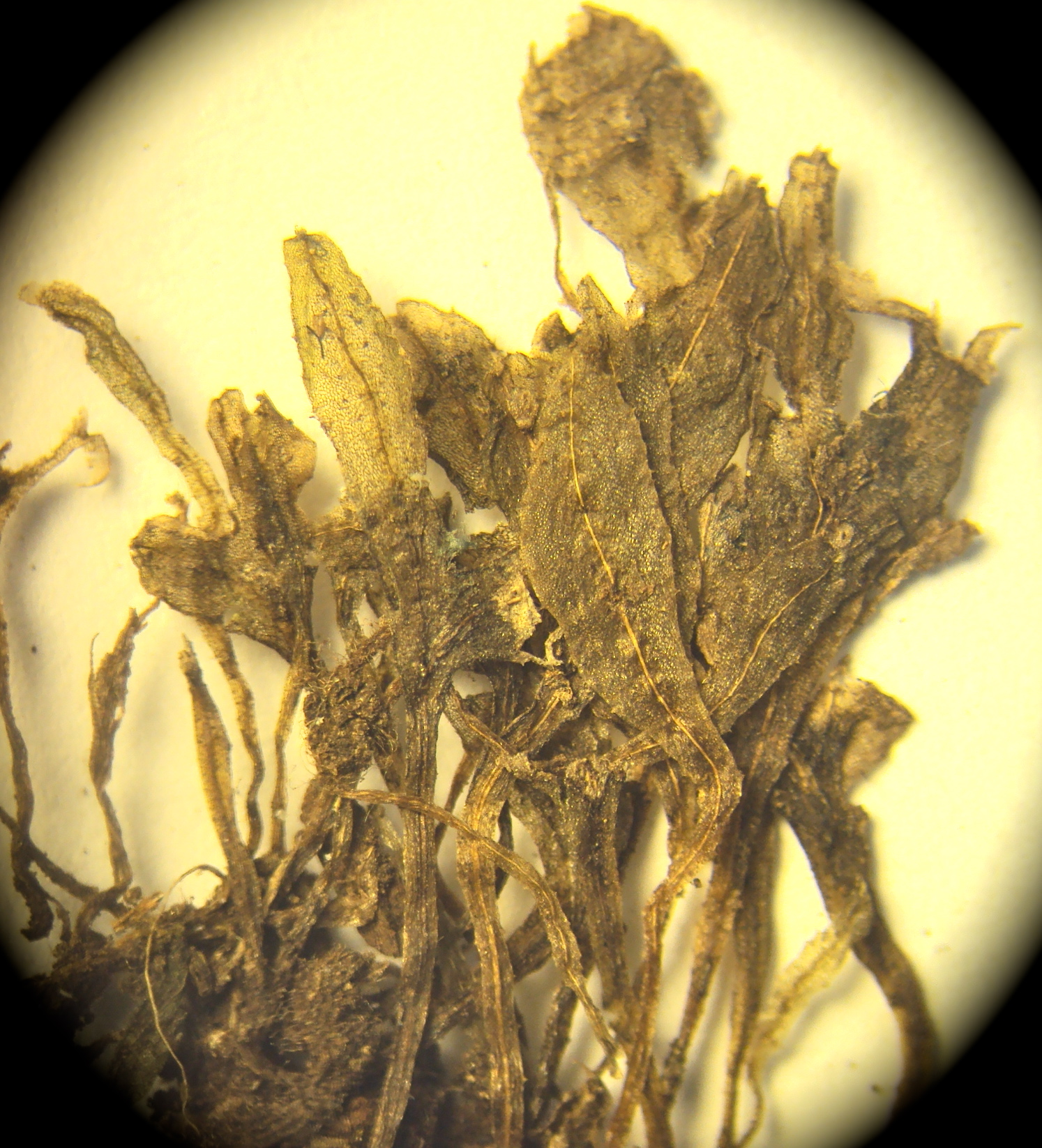

Scientific classification
- Kingdom: Plantae
- Division: Marchantiophyta
- Class: Jungermanniopsida
- Order: Pallaviciniales
- Family: Pallaviciniaceae
- Genus: Jensenia
- Species: J. spinosa

Binomial name
- Jensenia spinosa (Lindenb. & Gottsche) Grolle

Synonyms
- Pallavicinia spinosa (Lindenb. & Gottsche) Grolle 1979, illegitimate homonym, not (Gottsche) Steph. 1892 nor Steph. ex Yoshin. 1894; Symphyogyna spinosa Lindenb. & Gottsche (basionym)

= Jensenia spinosa =

Species of liverwort

Jensenia spinosa is a dioicous bryophyte plant in the liverwort family Pallaviciniaceae. It is the only African member of the genus Jensenia, and generally occurs at high elevations. It is widespread but scarce, and has been found in South Africa, Malawi, Tanzania, Rwanda (Volcanoes National Park at 3,650m), the Democratic Republic of the Congo, as well as the islands of Mauritius, Réunion and Saint Helena.

Jensenia spinosa is very similar to its neotropical relative J. erythropus, though geographically isolated. Both may be confused with Symphyogyna species, but the latter's scale-shaped, rather than cup-shaped involucres have been useful in distinguishing the two genera.
