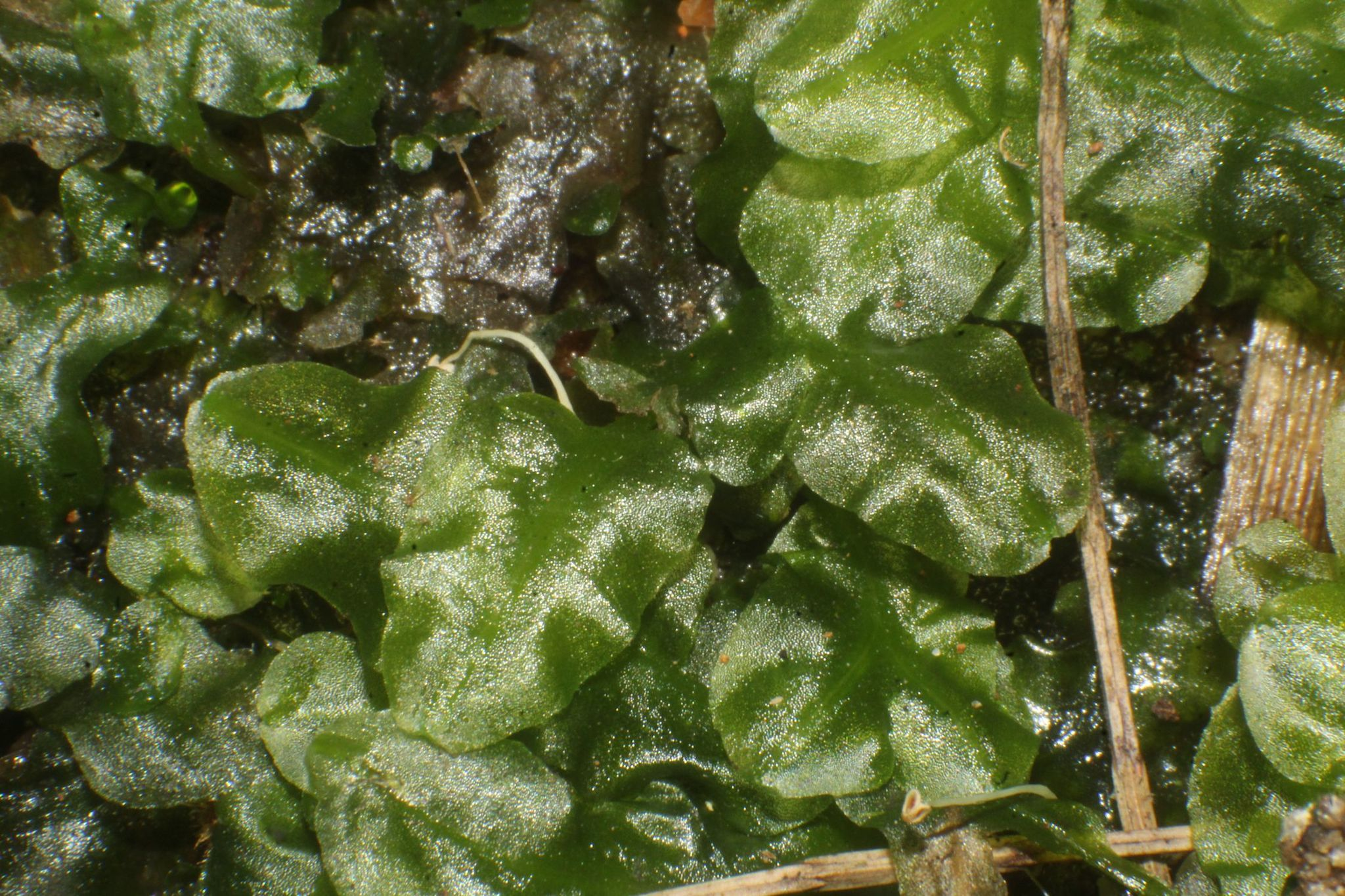
- Podomitrium phyllanthus. Note the undulating margins

Scientific classification
- Kingdom: Plantae
- Division: Marchantiophyta
- Class: Jungermanniopsida
- Order: Pallaviciniales
- Family: Pallaviciniaceae
- Genus: Podomitrium
- Species: P. phyllanthus

Binomial name
- Podomitrium phyllanthus (Hook.) Mitt.
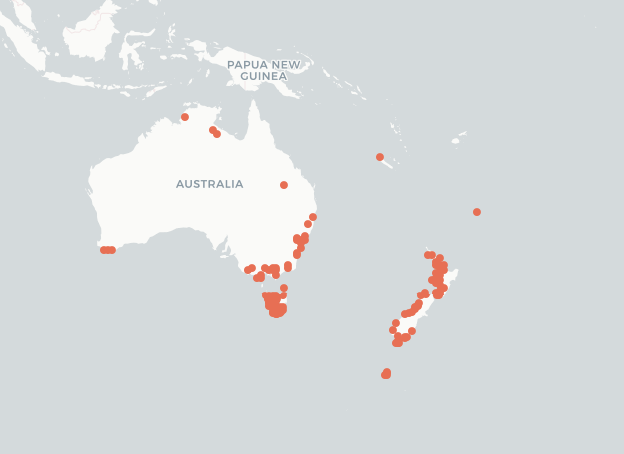
- Podomitrium phyllanthus has a sparse distribution in Australia, New Zealand and New Caledonia.

= Podomitrium phyllanthus =

Species of liverwort

Podomitrium phyllanthus is a thalloid liverwort in the family Pallaviciniaceae. It is found in wet forests and rainforests of Australia, New Zealand and New Caledonia.

== Habit ==
Podomitrium phyllanthus is a thalloid, unbranched liverwort with undulate margins. The thallus is up to 70mm long and 7mm wide, and tapers at the base to form a spathulate shape. The thallus is bright green in colour with a single vein down each thallus. Single-celled rhizoids grow from the base of the thallus to keep the liverwort attached to the substrate.

When reproducing sexually, P. phyllanthus individuals grow a white seta (stalk) from the base of the thallus upon which bears a single black capsule holding millions of tiny spores for reproduction. When reproducing asexually, the upper surface of the thallus holds gemma cups. The species can often be confused with Symphyogyna or Pallavicinia; the difference is that P. phyllanthus does not branch as often as Symphyogna and has undulate margins without teeth.

== Reproduction ==
Sexual (gametophyte) and asexual (sporophyte) generations characterise liverwort life cycles; the thallus is haploid and the dominant generation and develops from a germinating spore. Sperm from the male reproductive organ (antheridium) travel through an aqueous environment to fertilise the eggs held in the female reproductive organ (archegonium); consequently the species are dependent on moist environments. The sporophyte generation develops from this diploid embryo and forms a sporangium at its apex; the capsule. Spores are released when the sporangium is ruptured, which marks the start of the next gametophyte generation. Liverworts can also reproduce asexually via gemma cups, which disperse clones of the parent via water droplets.

== Distribution and habitat ==
Podomitrium phyllanthus is distributed sparsely around Australia, especially in Tasmania and the east coast of Australia; New Zealand, on both the North and South Island, the Auckland Islands and Raoul Island; and New Caledonia. Its distribution aligns with the presence of wet forest and rainforest in which it resides. The species' distribution is also a product of its relatively low dispersion capability. P. phyllanthus grows on moist soil, damp rocks or fallen trees. The species has a patchy distribution within forests.

== Uses ==
The plants are not directly economically important to humans but are an important part of the ecosystem as nutrition for animals and by facilitating decay and aiding disintegration of rocks through their ability to retain moisture. Therefore, P. phyllanthus has an indirect economic importance to humans, since functioning ecosystems provide humans with ecosystem services such as carbon sequestration and clean water supplies.

== Threats and conservation ==
IUCN categorises the species globally as viable i.e. of least concern; this means the species does not face major threats in the near future and thus is not included on the red list. Like many species, however, it faces threats from deforestation and changing conditions with climate change.
