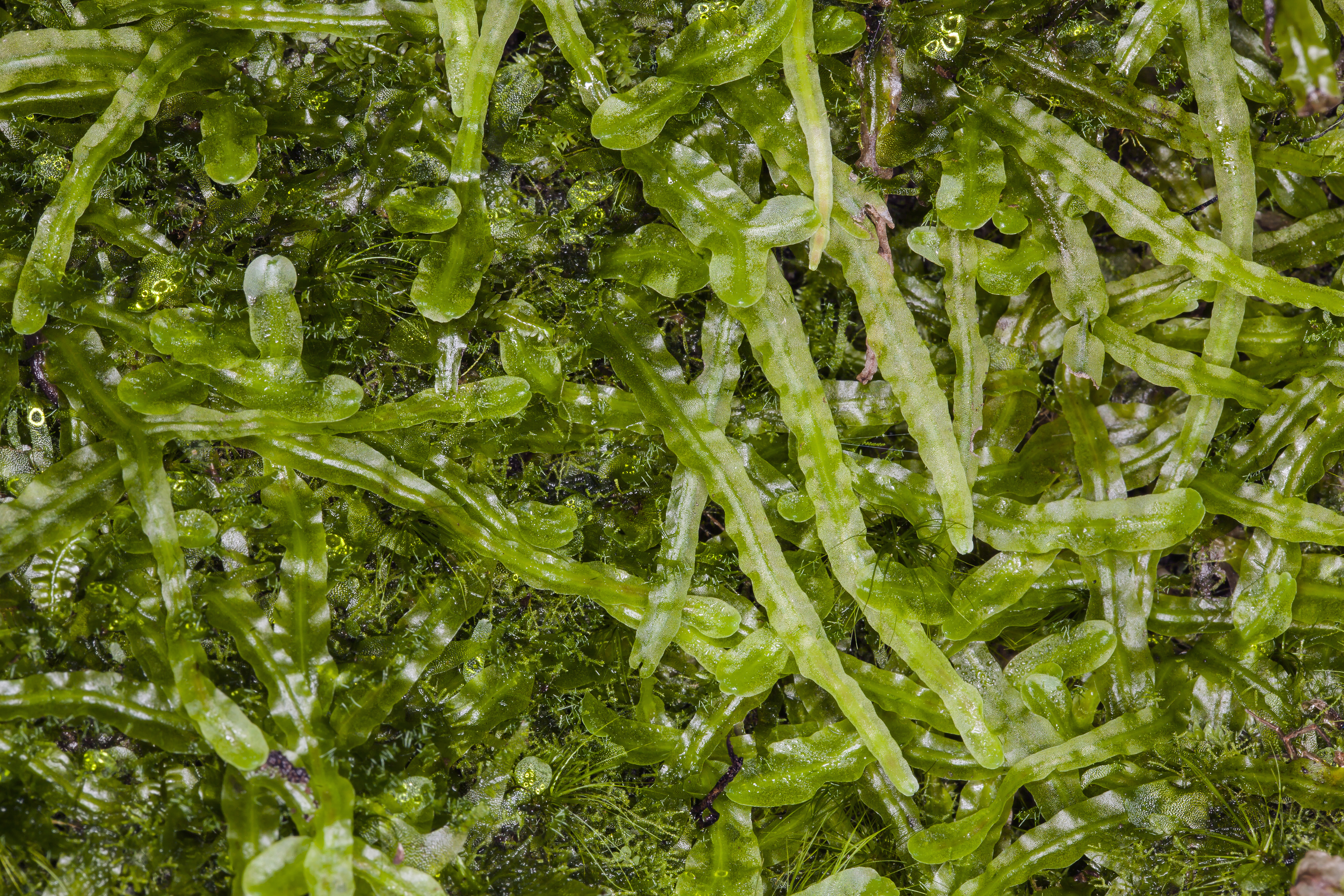

Conservation status
- Vulnerable (IUCN 3.1) (Europe regional assessment)

- Secure (NatureServe)

Scientific classification
- Kingdom: Plantae
- Division: Marchantiophyta
- Class: Jungermanniopsida
- Order: Pallaviciniales
- Family: Pallaviciniaceae
- Genus: Pallavicinia
- Species: P. lyellii

Binomial name
- Pallavicinia lyellii (Hook.) Carruth.

Synonyms
- Jungermannia lyellii Hook.; Pallavicinia pilifera Steph.; Jungermannia oblonga Schwein.; Dilaena lyelii (Hook.) Dumort.; Diplomitrion lyellii (Hook.) Corda; Diplolaena lyellii (Hook.) Dumort.; Jungermannia byssophora Lehm. & Lindenb.; Gymnomitrion lyellii (Hook.) Huebener; Symphyogyna goebelii Steph.; Diplolaena crispata Mont.; Blyttia byssophora (Lehm. & Lindenb.) Nees; Blytia crispata (Mont.) Nees; Blyttia lyellii (Hook.) Endl. ex Gottsche, Lindenb. & Nees; Hollia lyellii (Hook.) Sull.; Steetzia crispata (Mont.) Lehm.; Sweetzia lyellii (Hook.) Lehm.; Symphyogyna oblonga (Schwein.) Gottsche, Lindenb. & Nees; Symphyogyna schweinitzii Mont. & Nees; Blyttia radiculosa Sande Lac.; Wuestneia lyellii (Hook.) Brockm.; Pallavicinia byssophora (Lehm. & Lindenb.) Trevis.; Pallavicinia crispata (Mont.) Trevis.; Podomitrium majus Schiffn.; Calycularia radiculosa (Sande Lac.) Steph.; Pallavicinia attenuata Steph.; Pallavicinia simplex Steph.; Pallavicinia radiculosa (Sande Lac.) Schiffn.; Pallavicinia husnotii Steph.; Pallavicinia latifrons Steph.; Pallavicinia canara Steph.; Pallavicinia chinensis Steph.; Pallavicinia grandicalycina Steph.; Pallavicinia myriolacera Steph.; Pallavicinia valida Herzog; Diplolaena lyellii f. major Nees; Blytia lyellii var. major (Nees) Gottsche, Lindenb. & Nees; Pallavicinia indica var. major Schiffn.

= Pallavicinia lyellii =

Species of plant

Pallavicinia lyellii, the ribbonwort or veilwort, is a dioicous bryophyte plant in the liverwort family Pallaviciniaceae. Often seen in moist situations on rocks and soil, with a worldwide distribution.
