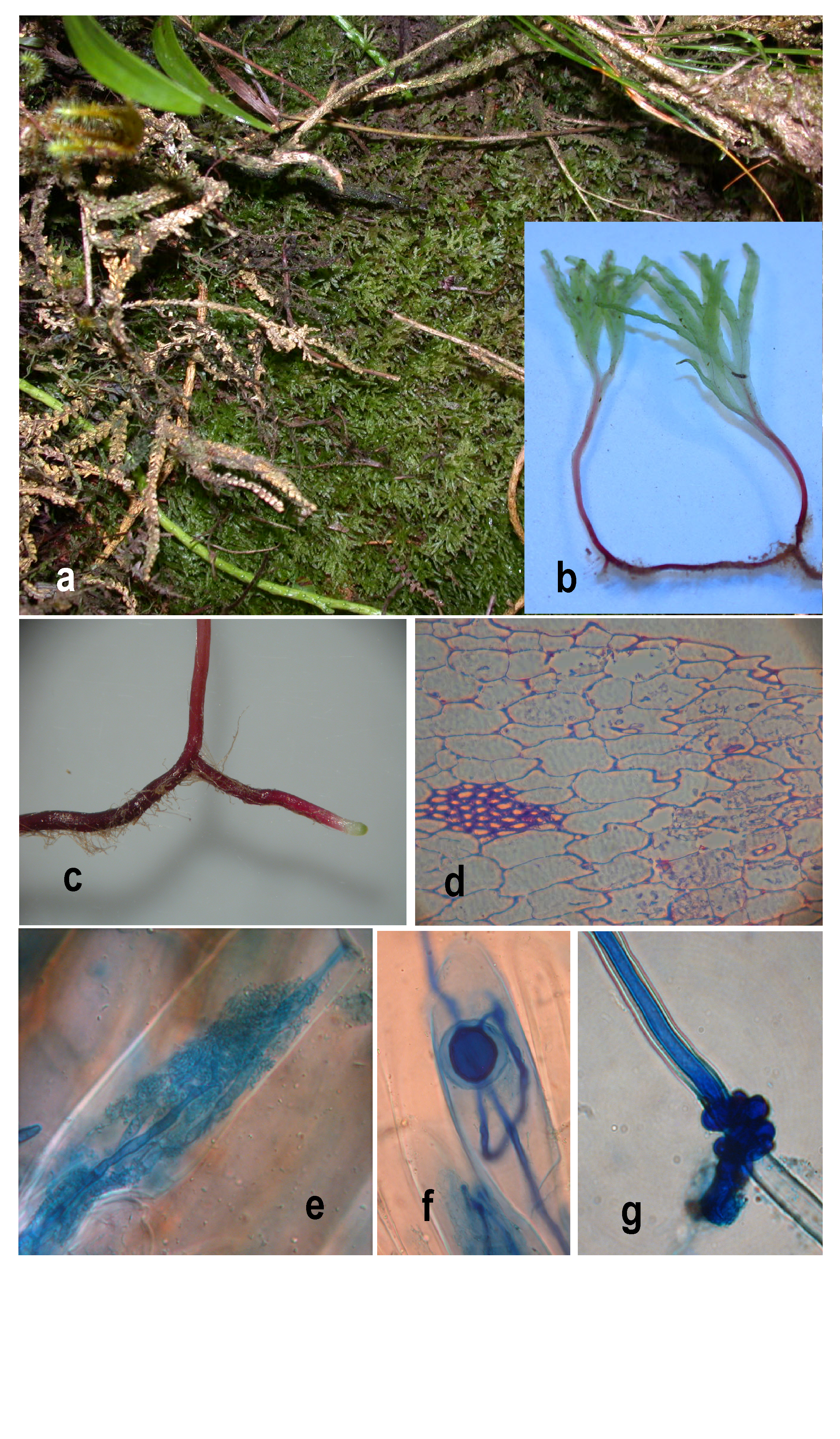
- Jensenia erythropus. a bunch of moss, b single plant, c axis with rhizoids, d cross section with xylem and mycorrhizal fungi (glomeromycota) en the parenchym, e Arbuscle, f Vesicle, g Rhizoid with hypha

Scientific classification
- Kingdom: Plantae
- Division: Marchantiophyta
- Class: Jungermanniopsida
- Order: Pallaviciniales
- Family: Pallaviciniaceae
- Genus: Jensenia; Lindb. 1868

Species
- Jensenia angulata Jensenia canicruria Jensenia decipiens Jensenia difformis Jensenia erythropus Jensenia lewisi Jensenia pisicolor Jensenia spinosa

Synonyms
- Makednothallus; Mittenia

= Jensenia =

Genus of liverworts

Jensenia is a bryophyte plant genus in the liverwort family Pallaviciniaceae. It has been treated as a subgenus of Pallavicinia by several authors, though a set of features seems to set it apart as a genus. The six or seven species of the genus belong to a southern, possibly Gondwana element.

== General characteristics ==
Jensenia liverworts are dioicous. Compared to Pallavicinia liverworts, their thallus grows erect, and branches tree-like, rather than trailing the ground. The thallus is perched on an ascending stipe which grows from a creeping rhizome. Slime papillae are absent from the thallus margin, though locally present elsewhere. The midrib of the thallus is broad but ill-defined.

== Reproductive morphology ==
Male reproductive organs are scattered over the thallus's dorsal surface, while female organs are specifically placed near a bifurcation of the frond. The pseudoperianth, a tube of thallus tissue protecting the archegonia, is basally fused with the calyptra. Following fertilization, the sporophyte is enveloped by three structures: the cup-shaped involucre, cylindrical pseudoperianth and the calyptra. The spore surfaces are irregularly fasciated.
