= Symphyogyna brasiliensis =

Scientific classification
- Kingdom: Plantae
- Division: Marchantiophyta
- Class: Jungermanniopsida
- Order: Pallaviciniales
- Family: Pallaviciniaceae
- Genus: Symphyogyna
- Species: S. brasiliensis

Binomial name
- Symphyogyna brasiliensis Nees & Mont.

Species of liverwort

Symphyogyna brasiliensis is a species of liverwort belonging to the family Pallaviciniaceae.

A study in tropical Ecuador found that Symphyogyna brasiliensis was typically not found in urban environments despite being found in a nearby pristine location, suggesting that the species is sensitive to anthropogenic effects such as the presence of wastewater and heavy metal pollution. The closely related Symphyogyna brongniartii showed the same distribution pattern.
