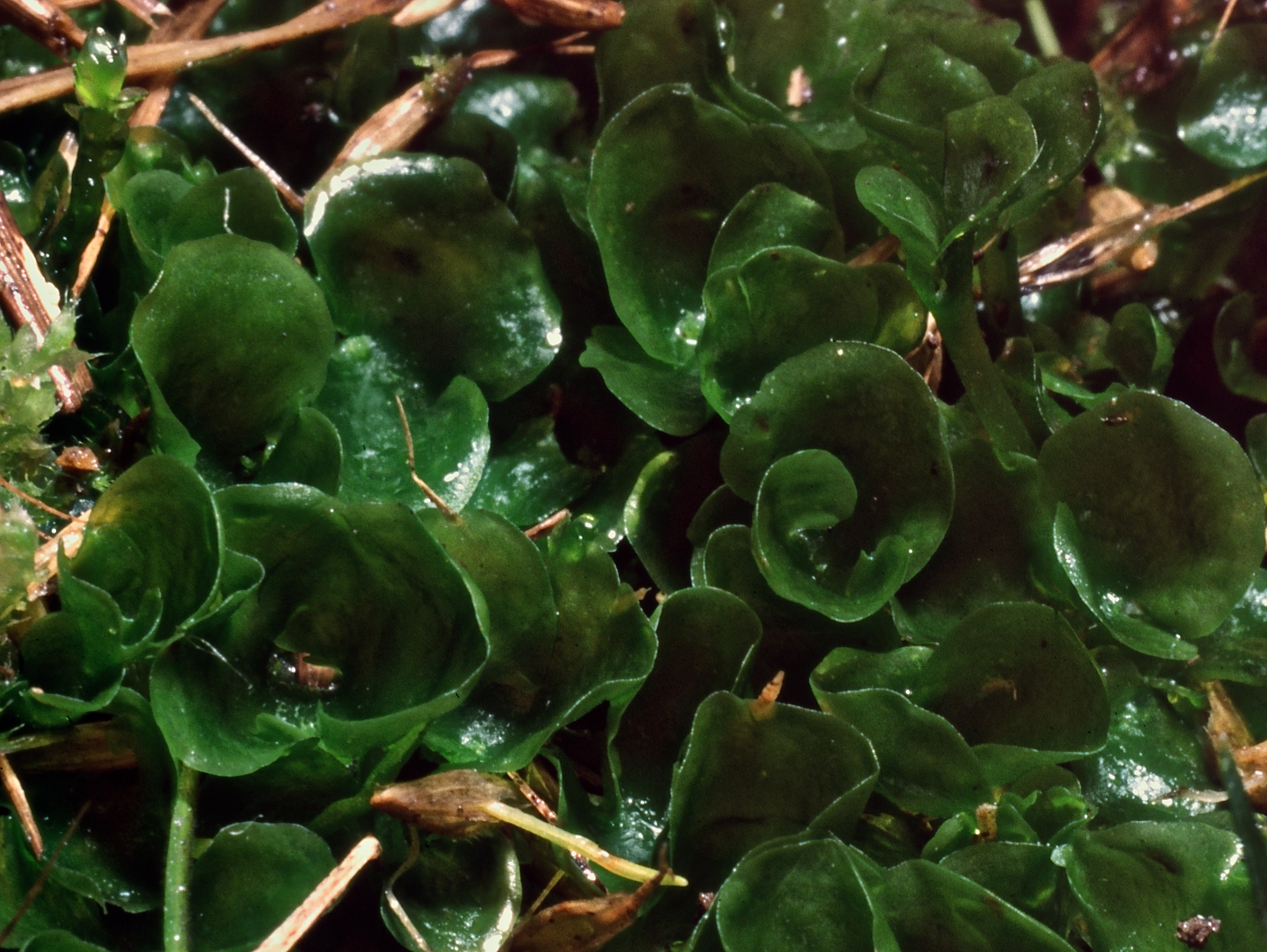

Scientific classification
- Kingdom: Plantae
- Division: Marchantiophyta
- Class: Jungermanniopsida
- Order: Pallaviciniales
- Family: Phyllothalliaceae
- Genus: Phyllothallia
- Species: P. nivicola

Binomial name
- Phyllothallia nivicola E.A.Hodgs.

= Phyllothallia nivicola =

Species of liverwort

Phyllothallia nivicola is a species of liverwort of the family Phyllothalliaceae endemic to New Zealand. It was described by Amy Hodgson.
