= Stenocorus vestitus =

Scientific classification
- Domain: Eukaryota
- Kingdom: Animalia
- Phylum: Arthropoda
- Class: Insecta
- Order: Coleoptera
- Suborder: Polyphaga
- Infraorder: Cucujiformia
- Family: Cerambycidae
- Genus: Stenocorus
- Species: S. vestitus

Binomial name
- Stenocorus vestitus Leng, 1920

Species of beetle

Stenocorus vestitus (also known as flower longhorn) is a species of beetle in the family Cerambycidae. Just like Stenocorus meridianus, the females of this species are black coloured while males are brown.
