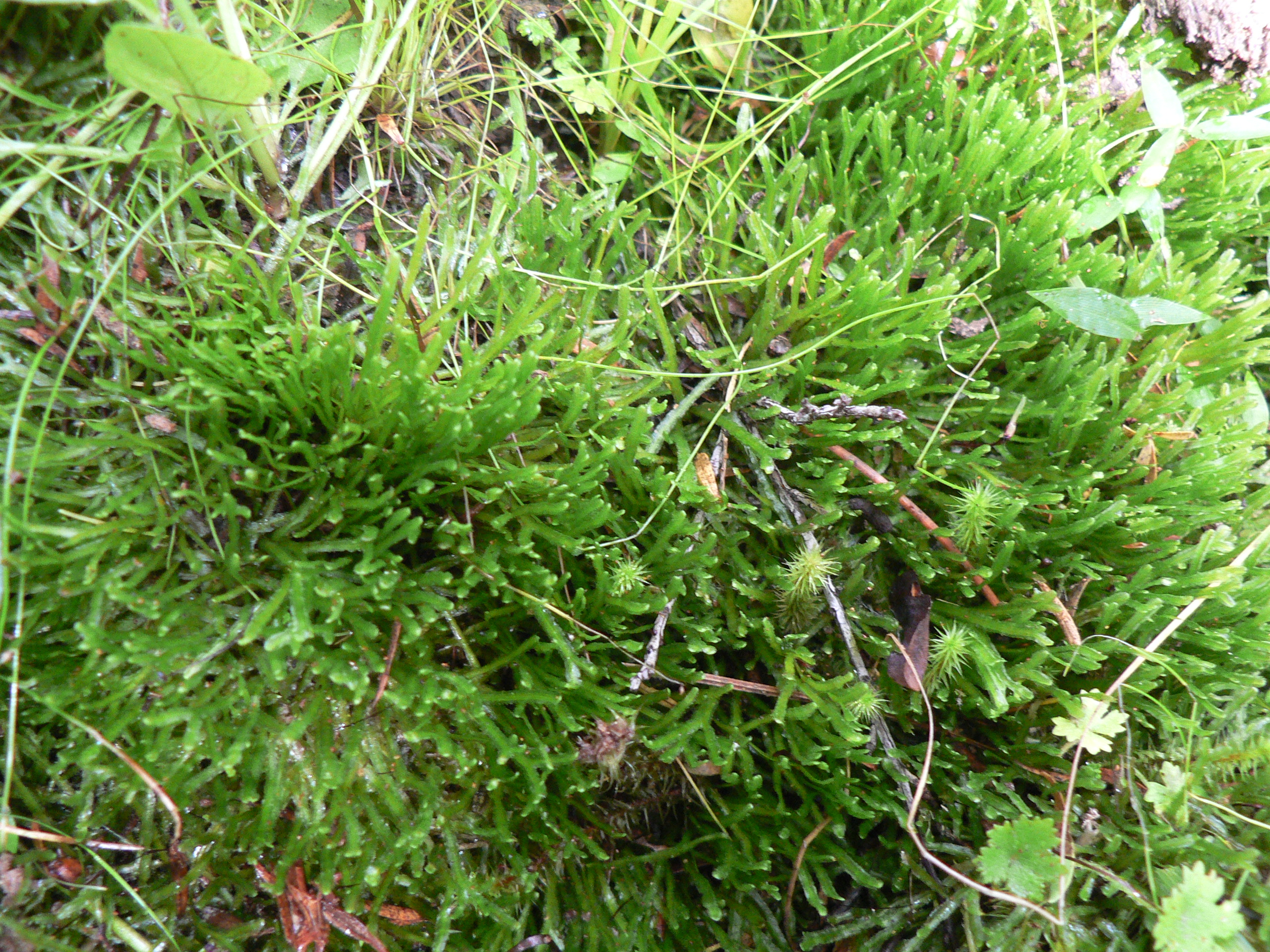
- Pallavicinia xiphoides

Scientific classification
- Kingdom: Plantae
- Clade: Embryophytes
- Division: Marchantiophyta
- Class: Jungermanniopsida
- Order: Pallaviciniales
- Family: Pallaviciniaceae
- Genus: Pallavicinia; S.F.Gray 1821, corr. Trev. 1874, nom. cons.

Synonyms
- List: Blyttia Endl. 1840, illegitimate homonym, not Arn. 1838 nor Fr. 1839; Dilaena; Diplomitrion; Hollia; Pallavicinius; Steetzia; Thedenia; Wuestneia

= Pallavicinia =

Genus of liverworts

Pallavicinia is a globally distributed genus in the liverwort family Pallaviciniaceae. Thallus is simple and contains a strong hair-like midrib. Thallus area except midrib made out of one layer of cells. Thallus is dark green in color and it is very small (3–6 cm (1.2–2.4 in) in long and 4-5 mm broad). Margins are entirely or irregularly lobed. Most species are distributed in tropical, subtropical or temperate regions. It grows in shady and moist environments, such as moist soil-covered rocks and banks of fresh water streams. Female thallus lobes have cup-shaped fringed receptacles.

Species

1. Pallavicinia ambigua
2. Pallavicinia baldwinii
3. Pallavicinia blytii
4. Pallavicinia byssophora
5. Pallavicinia isoblasta
6. Pallavicinia levieri
7. Pallavicinia lyellii
8. Pallavicinia radiculosa
9. Pallavicinia serrata
10. Pallavicinia spinosa
11. Pallavicinia subciliata
12. Pallavicinia valida
13. Pallavicinia xiphoides

formerly included

1. P. crassifrons, syn of Jensenia crassifrons
2. P. erimona, syn of Hattorianthus erimonus
3. P. erythropus, syn of Jensenia erythropus
4. P. hibernica, syn of Moerckia hibernica
5. P. rubescens, syn of Symphyogyna brasiliensis
6. P. stephanii, syn of Makednothallus stephanii
7. P. subflabellatus, syn of Makednothallus subflabellatus
8. P. tenuinervis, syn of Symphyogyna tenuinervis
9. P. wallisii, syn of Jensenia wallisii
