= Blyttia =

Blyttia may refer to:

- Blyttia (journal), a Norwegian botanical journal
- Blyttia Arn. (1838) a legitimate genus of flowering plants in the family Apocynaceae, considered a synonym of Vincetoxicum
- Blyttia Fr. (1839) an illegitimate genus of flowering plants in the family Poaceae, considered a synonym of Cinna
- Blyttia Endl. (1840) an illegitimate genus of liverworts, superseded by the genus Moerckia Gottsche 1860
