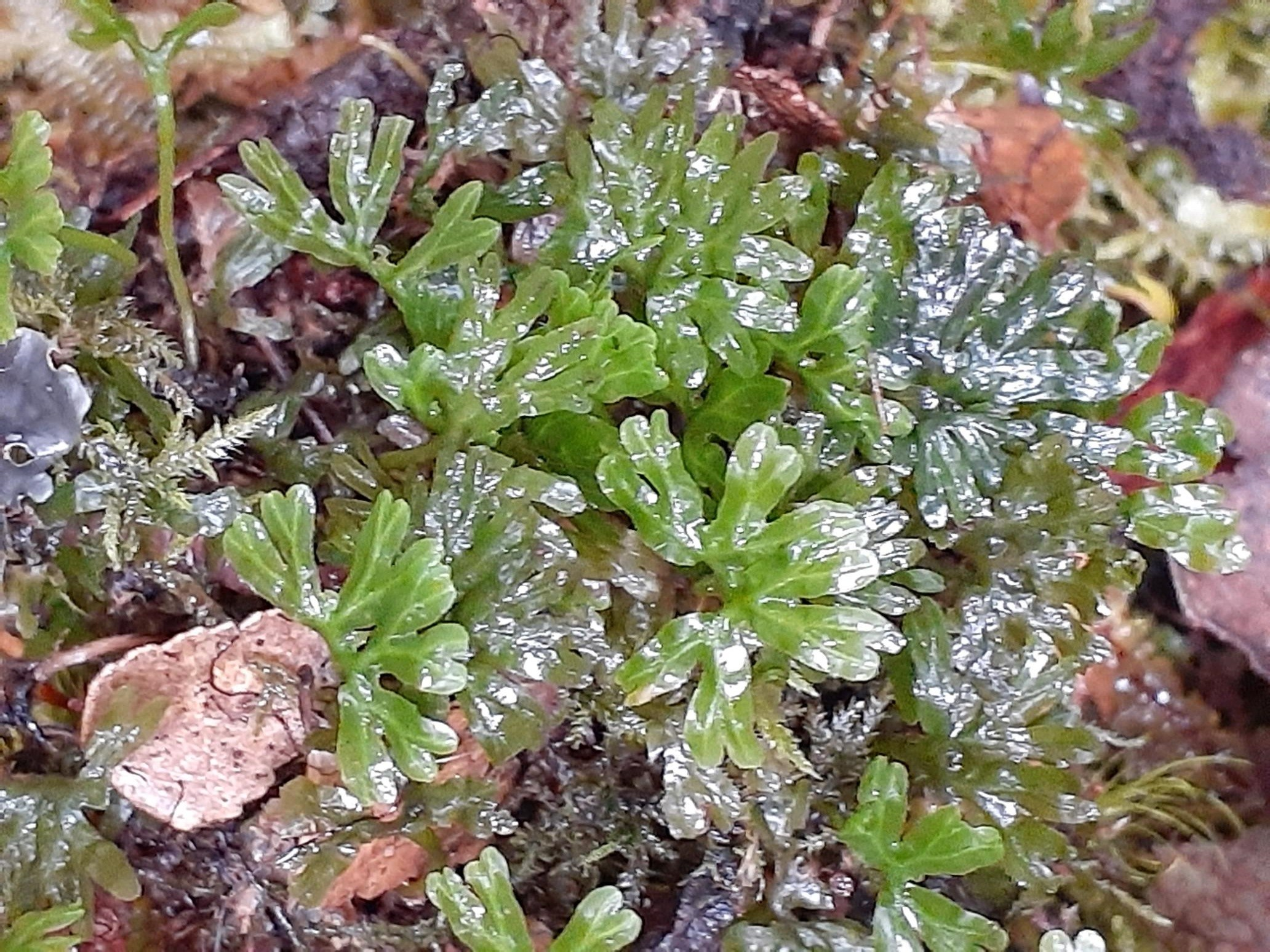
- Hymenophyton flabellatum

Scientific classification
- Kingdom: Plantae
- Division: Marchantiophyta
- Class: Jungermanniopsida
- Order: Pallaviciniales
- Family: Hymenophytaceae; R.M.Schust.
- Genus: Hymenophyton; Dumort.

Species
- Hymenophyton flabellatum; Hymenophyton leptopodum; Hymenophyton pedicellatum

= Hymenophyton =

Genus of liverworts

Hymenophyton is a genus of the order Pallaviciniales (liverworts) containing one to three species. The genus was formerly described as monotypic, as each member possesses a close morphological resemblance, but phytochemical and molecular evidence now supports an infrageneric classification two separate species. The name Hymenophyton leptopodum, regarded as a synonym of Hymenophyton flabellatum, has been resurrected. A population found in Chile is regarded as a separate clade, and the reinstatement of Hymenophyton pedicellatum has been proposed.
