= Moerckia hibernica =

Scientific classification
- Kingdom: Plantae
- Division: Marchantiophyta
- Class: Jungermanniopsida
- Order: Pallaviciniales
- Family: Moerckiaceae
- Genus: Moerckia
- Species: M. hibernica

Binomial name
- Moerckia hibernica (Hook.) Gottsche

Species of liverwort

Moerckia hibernica (vernacular name: Irish ruffwort) is a species of liverwort belonging to the family Moerckiaceae.

It is native to the Northern Hemisphere.
