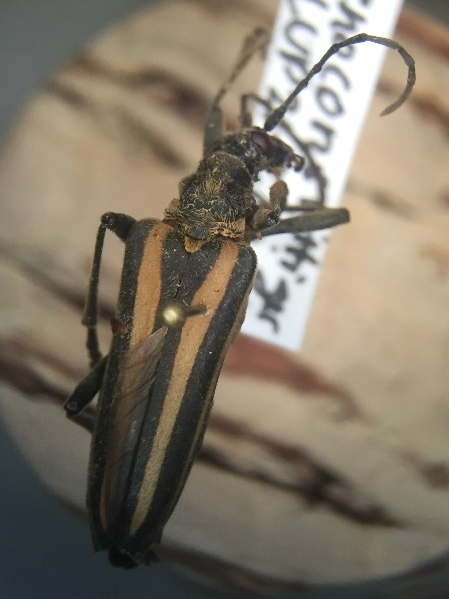

Scientific classification
- Domain: Eukaryota
- Kingdom: Animalia
- Phylum: Arthropoda
- Class: Insecta
- Order: Coleoptera
- Suborder: Polyphaga
- Infraorder: Cucujiformia
- Family: Cerambycidae
- Genus: Stenocorus
- Species: S. vittiger

Binomial name
- Stenocorus vittiger (Randall, 1838)

= Stenocorus vittiger =

Species of beetle

Stenocorus vittiger is a species of beetle in the family Cerambycidae. Similar to Analeptura lineola, this species has a brown coloured pronotum with 4 black stripes.
