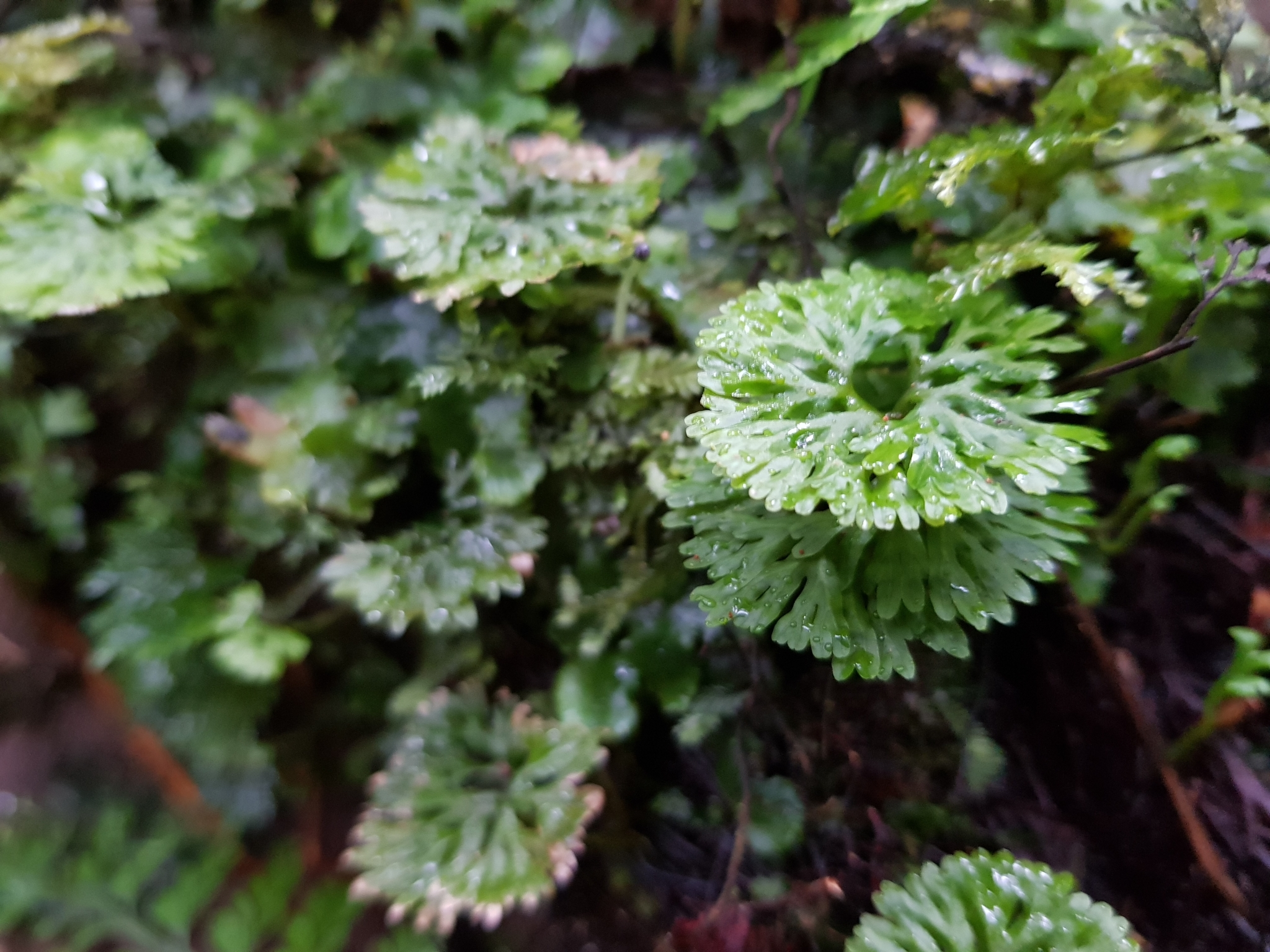

Scientific classification
- Kingdom: Plantae
- Division: Marchantiophyta
- Class: Jungermanniopsida
- Order: Pallaviciniales
- Family: Hymenophytaceae
- Genus: Hymenophyton
- Species: H. flabellatum

Binomial name
- Hymenophyton flabellatum (Labill.) Dumort. ex Trevis

= Hymenophyton flabellatum =

Species of liverwort

Hymenophyton flabellatum is a species of the order Pallaviciniales (liverworts), one of perhaps several species in the genus Hymenophyton. It is a dendroid thalloid liverwort belongs to the family Hymenophytaceae and is commonly known as Fan liverwort. It is found in New Zealand, Chile, and common in wet forests of Australia and Tasmania. Hymenophyton flabellatum closely resembles with small filmy fern, Hymenophyllum and can be confused with the liverwort, Symphyogyna hymenophyllum.

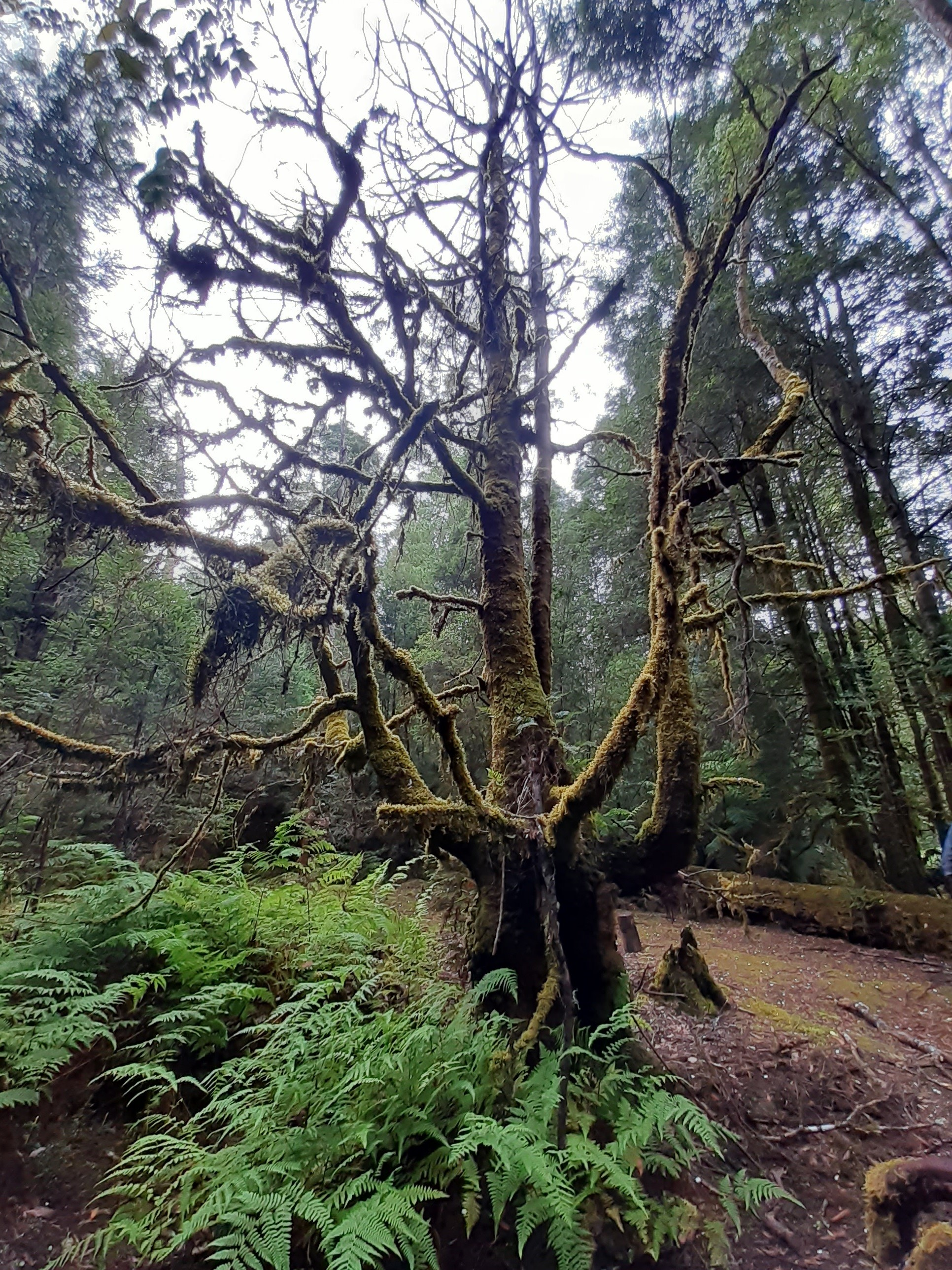
Growling Swallett

== Description ==
Hymenophyton flabellatum is plagiotropic, branched rhizome-like axes with aerial shoots divided into upright stalks. Palmate fronds or flabellate are olive green, with forking, 5-6 times and forked thallus wings spreading out horizontally. Segments are flat, slightly undulate at borders, 0.8 to 1.2mm in wide. Segments with obtuse apex are limited in growth. Growing apex contains 1-celled marginal slime papillae Lamina cells are 35-49μm in length, 23-30μm wide, 23-35μm thickness. Marginal cells are short of 18-23 μm in length and 33-35μm in width. 3 to 4 or 5 to 6 male branches per frond which are lateral on stalk or nerve bifurcation. Female scale has toothed margin. Hymenophyton species produce spores and disperse through a spirally thickened, elongate structure called elaters.

The central strand of Hymenophyton flabellatum contains long and axially elongated water conducting cells with pointed ends. The mature water conducting cells lack living contents and thickened wall of water conducting cells possess oblique slit shaped depression. Adjacent cells connected through small perforations within the depression.

== Distribution and habitat ==
Hymenophyton flabellatum commonly found in New Zealand, Australia, Tasmania, Chile in rain forest and wet forest. It grows on shaded wet soil, humus, and old logs in forest, and along rivers sides. Bush Blitz survey 2010 reported the prenece of Hymenophyton flabellatum in two locations, Seventeen Mile plain, Vale of Belvoir reserves, Tasmania. Additional report recorded the presence of this liverwort in Teepookana forest site in Tasmania, found on fallen portion of the old Huon pine tree.

== Phytochemicals ==
Apigenin 6,8-di-C-glycosides have been detected as characteristic chemical compounds in Hymenophyton flabellatum. Pungent-tasting chemical compound 1-(2,4,6-trimethoxyphenyl)-but-2(E)-en-1-one was isolated from ether extract of Hymenophyton flabellatum. This chemical compound is responsible for the pungent taste of H. flabellatum upon chewing.

== Insect relation ==
Hymenophyton flabellatum is act as a larval host, provide home and food for Sabatinca chalcophanes.
