= Stenocorus copei =

Scientific classification
- Domain: Eukaryota
- Kingdom: Animalia
- Phylum: Arthropoda
- Class: Insecta
- Order: Coleoptera
- Suborder: Polyphaga
- Infraorder: Cucujiformia
- Family: Cerambycidae
- Genus: Stenocorus
- Species: S. copei

Binomial name
- Stenocorus copei Linsley & Chemsak, 1972

Species of beetle

Stenocorus copei is a species of beetle in the family Cerambycidae. It was described by Linsley and Chemsak in 1972.
