= Amy Hodgson =

New Zealand botanist (1888–1983)

- Born: Eliza Amy Campbell; 10 October 1888; Havelock North, New Zealand
- Died: 7 January 1983 (aged 94); Hastings, New Zealand
- Awards: Fellow of the Royal Society of New Zealand; Fellow of the Linnean Society of London; Honorary Doctorate from Massey University.
- Scientific career
- Fields: Botany; hepaticology
- Author abbrev. (botany): E.A.Hodgs.

Eliza Amy Hodgson (née Campbell, 10 October 1888 – 7 January 1983) was a New Zealand botanist who specialised in liverworts.

== Early life ==
Hodgson was born in Havelock North and attended Pukahu Primary School and Napier Girls' High School. She went by her middle name Amy. At school she excelled in languages, leading to her ability to write accurate Latin descriptions of plants. Hodgson was self-educated in botany as her father refused to allow her to attend university. However, in secondary school, she was encouraged and taught in botany by her headmistress, A. E. J. Spencer, who would teach her students microscopy and take them to the monthly meetings of the Hawkes Bay Philosophical Society. After leaving school, she gained further botanical education through the Rev. Alexander Whyte.

== Botany work ==
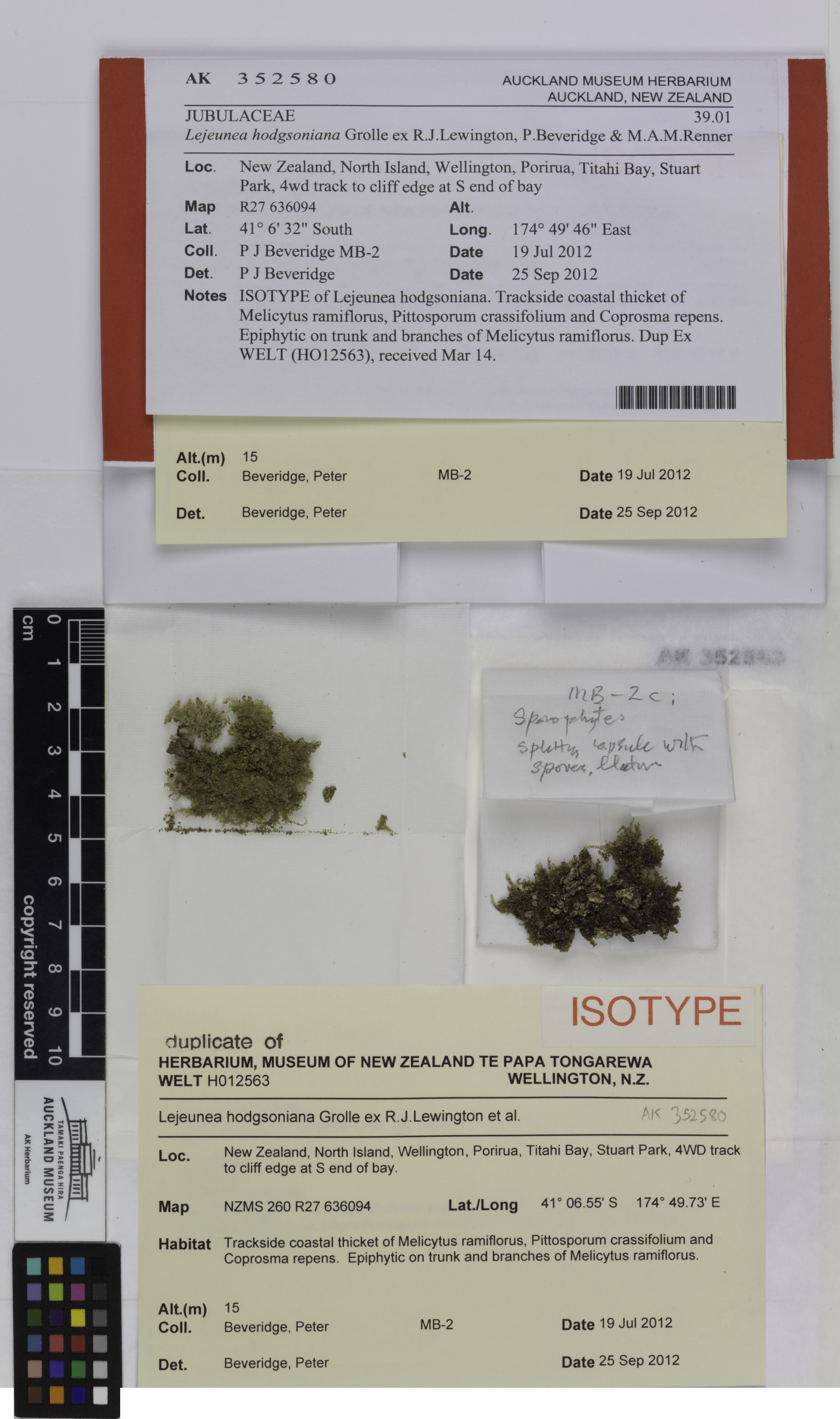
Lejeunea hodgsoniana

In the 1920s, Hodgson often collected specimens in the Hawke's Bay region and collaborated with other botanists, such as Harry Carse and Henry Blencowe Matthews. This led to her connection with George Osborne King Sainsbury, for whom she collected and with whom she regularly corresponded until his death. As Sainsbury had elected to work on the mosses of New Zealand, Hodgson focussed on liverworts, as well as the regional Flora of Hawke's Bay. She also collected and collaborated with Kenneth Willway Allison. Between 1931 and 1936 she issued three exsiccatae, one of them together with Sainsbury and Allison. Following advice from Sainsbury in 1928, Hodgson purchased her first microscope. This led to her novel observations of gemmae in Tortula abruptinervis, which was the subject of her first scientific paper, published at the age of 42. Hodgson went on to publish more than 30 papers thereafter, her final at age 84. In the course of her career she described two new families of liverworts (Acrobolbaceae; still retained, and Phyllothalliaceae; now included in Pallaviciniaceae), nine new genera, and published many new species and systematic changes to those existing. The liverwort genus Neohodgsonia was named for her, as were the species Cephalobus hodgsoniae (now placed in Andrewsianthus), Jungermannia hodgsoniae (now in Solenostoma), Lejeunea hodgsoniana, and Lepidolaena hodgsoniae (now in Lepidogyna).

Her herbarium was donated to Massey University in 1972.

== Recognition ==
She was elected a Fellow of the Linnean Society of London and in 1961 was accorded the same honour by the Royal Society of New Zealand. Hodgson was also an honorary member of the British Bryological Society.

Hodgson was awarded an honorary doctorate by Massey University in 1976.

In 2017, Hodges was selected as one of the Royal Society Te Apārangi's "150 women in 150 words", celebrating the contributions of women to knowledge in New Zealand.

The standard author abbreviation E.A.Hodgs. is used to indicate this person as the author when citing a botanical name.
