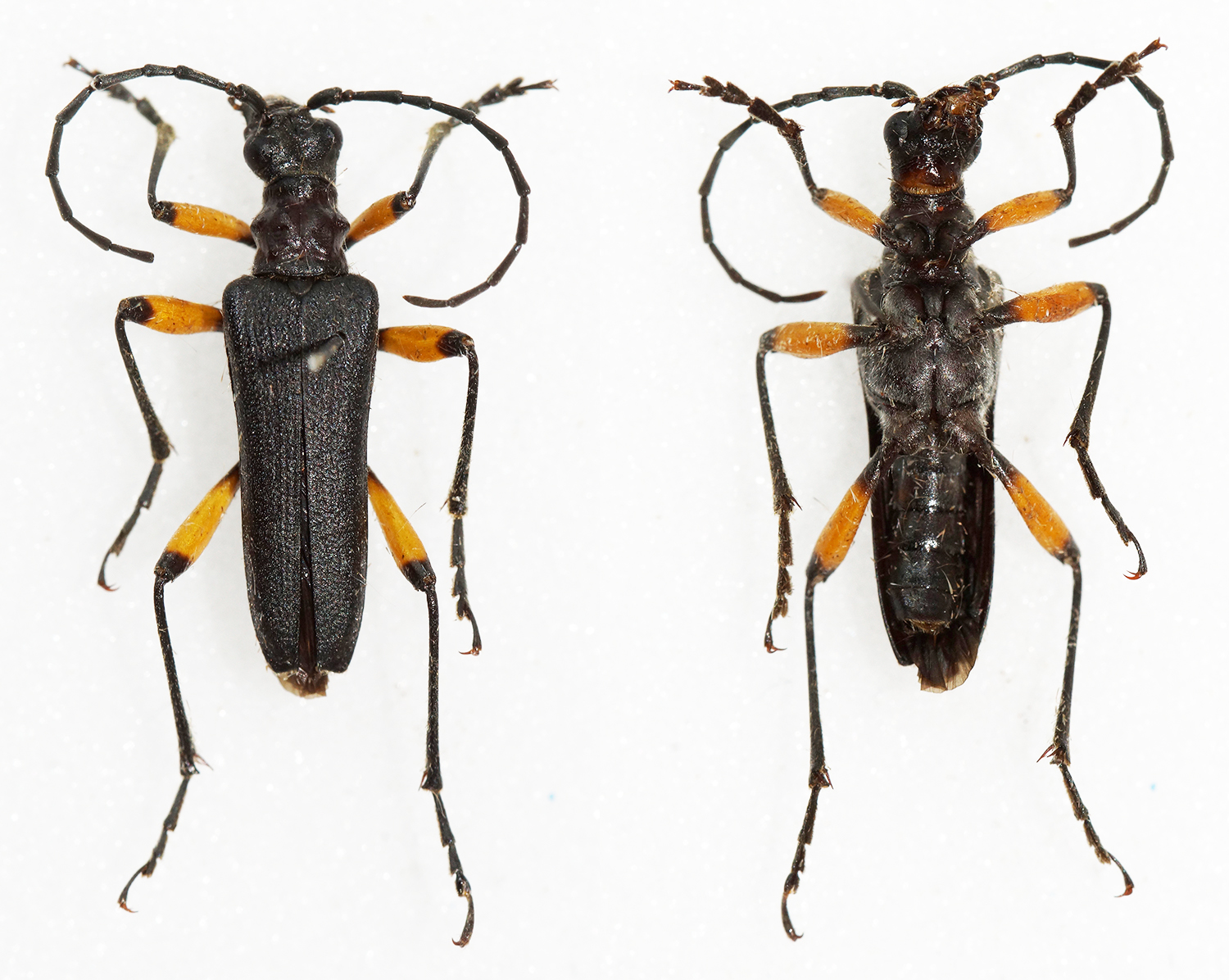

Scientific classification
- Domain: Eukaryota
- Kingdom: Animalia
- Phylum: Arthropoda
- Class: Insecta
- Order: Coleoptera
- Suborder: Polyphaga
- Infraorder: Cucujiformia
- Family: Cerambycidae
- Genus: Stenocorus
- Species: S. schaumii

Binomial name
- Stenocorus schaumii (LeConte, 1850)

= Stenocorus schaumii =

Species of beetle

Stenocorus schaumii is a species of beetle of the family Cerambycidae that is 17–29 millimetres (0.67–1.14 in) long. The colour is either black or brownish-red. Like other members of the genus, it has wide shoulders and tuberculated sides of the pronotum, with wrinkled elytron. Their larvae feed on Fraxinus, maple, and other hardwood plants.
