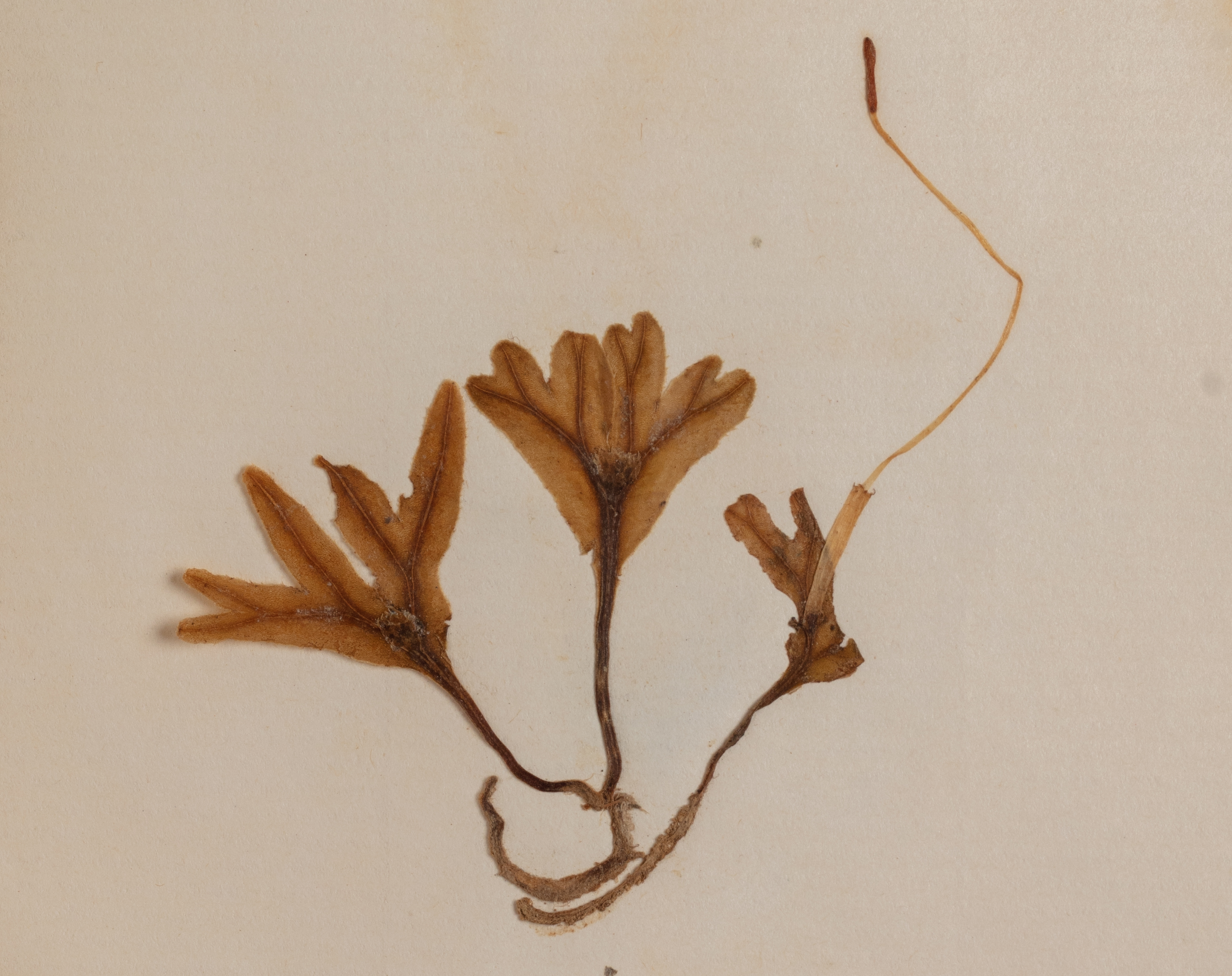
- Symphyogyna hymenophyllum

Scientific classification
- Kingdom: Plantae
- Division: Marchantiophyta
- Class: Jungermanniopsida
- Order: Pallaviciniales
- Family: Pallaviciniaceae
- Genus: Symphyogyna; Nees & Mont.

Synonyms
- Kormickia Steph.; Solenochaetium Trevis.; Strozzia Trevis.; Viviania Raddi & Mont.

= Symphyogyna =

Genus of liverworts

Symphyogyna is a genus in the liverworts in the family Pallaviciniaceae. Approximately 123 species are recognized. Although World Flora Online only accepted 46 species.

It is mainly found in Central and South America.

== Species ==
The Global Biodiversity Information Facility accepts 54 species:

- Symphyogyna apiculispina Steph.
- Symphyogyna aspera Steph. ex F.A.McCormick
- Symphyogyna atronervia Taylor
- Symphyogyna bogotensis Steph.
- Symphyogyna boliviensis Steph.
- Symphyogyna brasiliensis Nees & Mont.
- Symphyogyna brevicaulis Colenso
- Symphyogyna brongniartii Mont.
- Symphyogyna chiloensis Stephani
- Symphyogyna circinata Nees & Mont.
- Symphyogyna crassicosta Stephani
- Symphyogyna digitisquama Steph.
- Symphyogyna fuscovirens A.Evans
- Symphyogyna goebelii Stephani
- Symphyogyna grandibracteata Stephani
- Symphyogyna harveyana Taylor
- Symphyogyna hochstetteri Nees & Mont.
- Symphyogyna hymenophyllum (Hook.) Nees & Mont.
- Symphyogyna ignambiensis Hürl.
- Symphyogyna interrupta Carrington & Pearson
- Symphyogyna irregularis Steph.
- Symphyogyna lacerosquama Steph.
- Symphyogyna leptothelia Taylor
- Symphyogyna lindmanii A.Evans
- Symphyogyna luetzelburgii Herzog
- Symphyogyna marginata Steph.
- Symphyogyna mexicana Steph.
- Symphyogyna multiflora Steph.
- Symphyogyna paucidens Steph.
- Symphyogyna podophylla (Thunb.) Nees & Mont.
- Symphyogyna purpureolimbata E.A.Hodgs.
- Symphyogyna rectidens Grolle
- Symphyogyna rhizobola (Schwägr.) Nees
- Symphyogyna rhodina (Hook.f. & Taylor) Gottsche, Lindenb. & Nees
- Symphyogyna rubescens Steph.
- Symphyogyna rubritincta A.Evans
- Symphyogyna schweinitzii Mont. & Nees
- Symphyogyna semi-involucrata Austin
- Symphyogyna serrata Mitt.
- Symphyogyna similis Grolle
- Symphyogyna sinensis C.Gao, E.Z.Bai & C.Li
- Symphyogyna sinuata (Sw.) Nees & Mont.
- Symphyogyna subsimplex Mitt.
- Symphyogyna tenuinervis (Hook.f. & Taylor) Grolle
- Symphyogyna trivittata Spruce
- Symphyogyna ulvoides (Reinw., Blume & Nees) Nees
- Symphyogyna undulata Colenso
- Symphyogyna volkensii Steph.

== Other sources ==
- Evans, A.W. (1925), The lobate species of Symphyogyna. Transactions of the Connecticut Academy of Arts and Science 27: 1–50.
- Uribe, J. & Aguirre, J. (1995), Las especies colombianas del género Symphyogyna (Hepaticae: Pallaviciniaceae). Caldasia 17 (82–85): 429–458.
