= Stenocorus testaceus =

Scientific classification
- Domain: Eukaryota
- Kingdom: Animalia
- Phylum: Arthropoda
- Class: Insecta
- Order: Coleoptera
- Suborder: Polyphaga
- Infraorder: Cucujiformia
- Family: Cerambycidae
- Genus: Stenocorus
- Species: S. testaceus

Binomial name
- Stenocorus testaceus Linsley & Chemsak, 1972

Species of beetle

Stenocorus testaceus is a species of beetle in the family Cerambycidae. It was described by Linsley and Chemsak in 1972. It was one of the later discovered species within the Genus Stenocoros, which contains 12 other known species, many of which were discovered in the 19th century.
