= Stenocorus cylindricollis =

Scientific classification
- Domain: Eukaryota
- Kingdom: Animalia
- Phylum: Arthropoda
- Class: Insecta
- Order: Coleoptera
- Suborder: Polyphaga
- Infraorder: Cucujiformia
- Family: Cerambycidae
- Genus: Stenocorus
- Species: S. cylindricollis

Binomial name
- Stenocorus cylindricollis (Say, 1824)

Species of beetle

Stenocorus cylindricollis is a species of beetle from family Cerambycidae. The species are either black or brown coloured.
