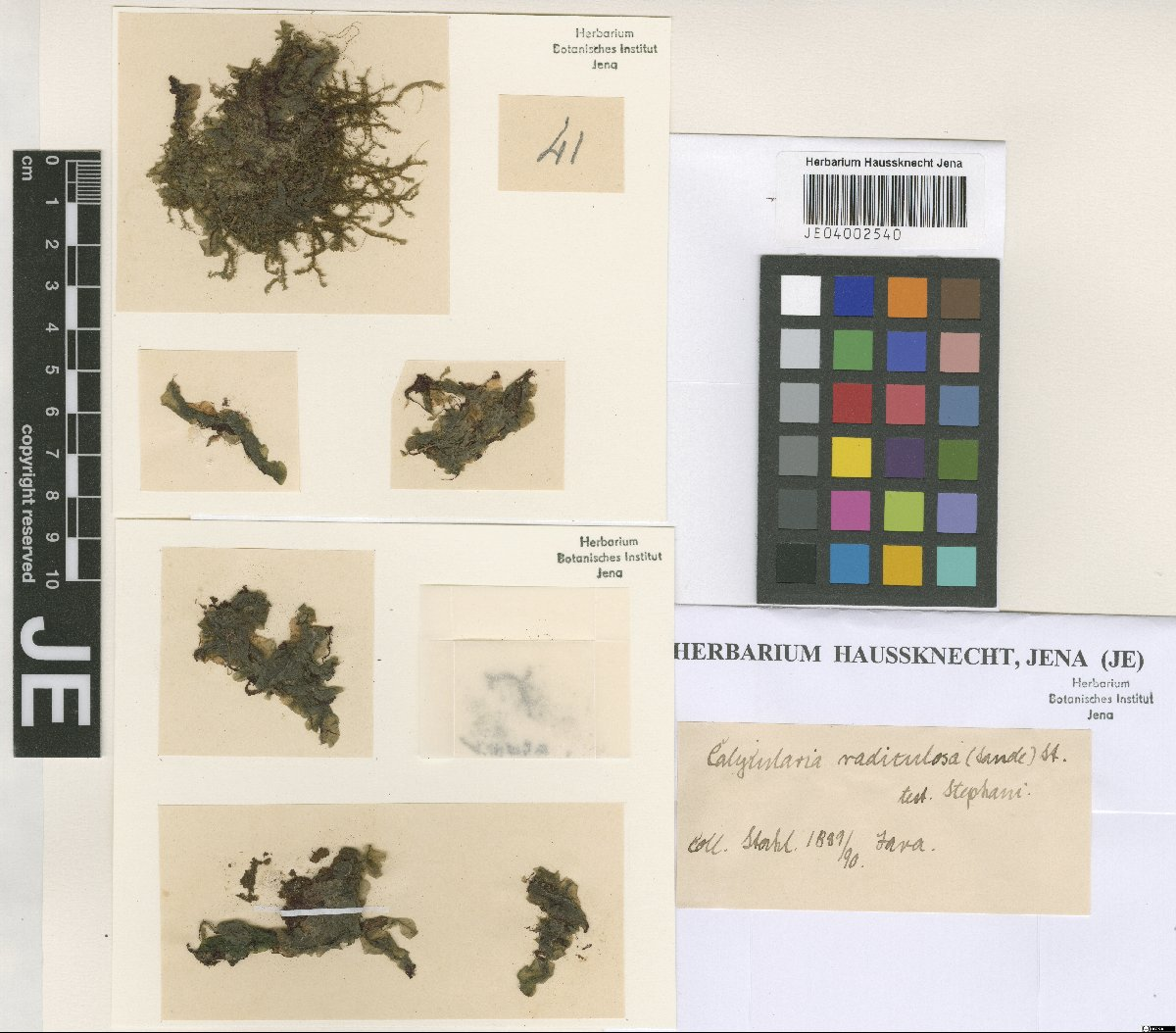

Scientific classification
- Kingdom: Plantae
- Division: Marchantiophyta
- Class: Jungermanniopsida
- Order: Pallaviciniales
- Family: Sandeothallaceae; R.M.Schust.
- Genus: Sandeothallus; R.M.Schust.

Species
- Sandeothallus japonicus (Inoue) Crand.-Stotl. & Stotler; Sandeothallus radiculosus (Schiffn.) R.M.Schust.

= Sandeothallus =

Genus of liverworts

Sandeothallus is a small genus of liverworts restricted to East Asia. It is classified in the order of Pallaviciniales and is the only member of the family, Sandeothallaceae within that order.

The genus was circumscribed by Rudolf Mathias Schuster in Nova Hedwigia vol.36 on pages 10 and 15 in 1982.

The genus name of Sandeothallus is in honour of Cornelius Marinus van der Sande Lacoste (1815–1887), who was a Dutch physician, botanist (Bryology). He practised medicine in 1843 in Amsterdam.
