= Stenocorus trivittatus =

Scientific classification
- Domain: Eukaryota
- Kingdom: Animalia
- Phylum: Arthropoda
- Class: Insecta
- Order: Coleoptera
- Suborder: Polyphaga
- Infraorder: Cucujiformia
- Family: Cerambycidae
- Genus: Stenocorus
- Species: S. trivittatus

Binomial name
- Stenocorus trivittatus (Say, 1824)

Species of beetle

Stenocorus trivittatus is a species of beetle in the family Cerambycidae. It was described by Thomas Say in 1824.
