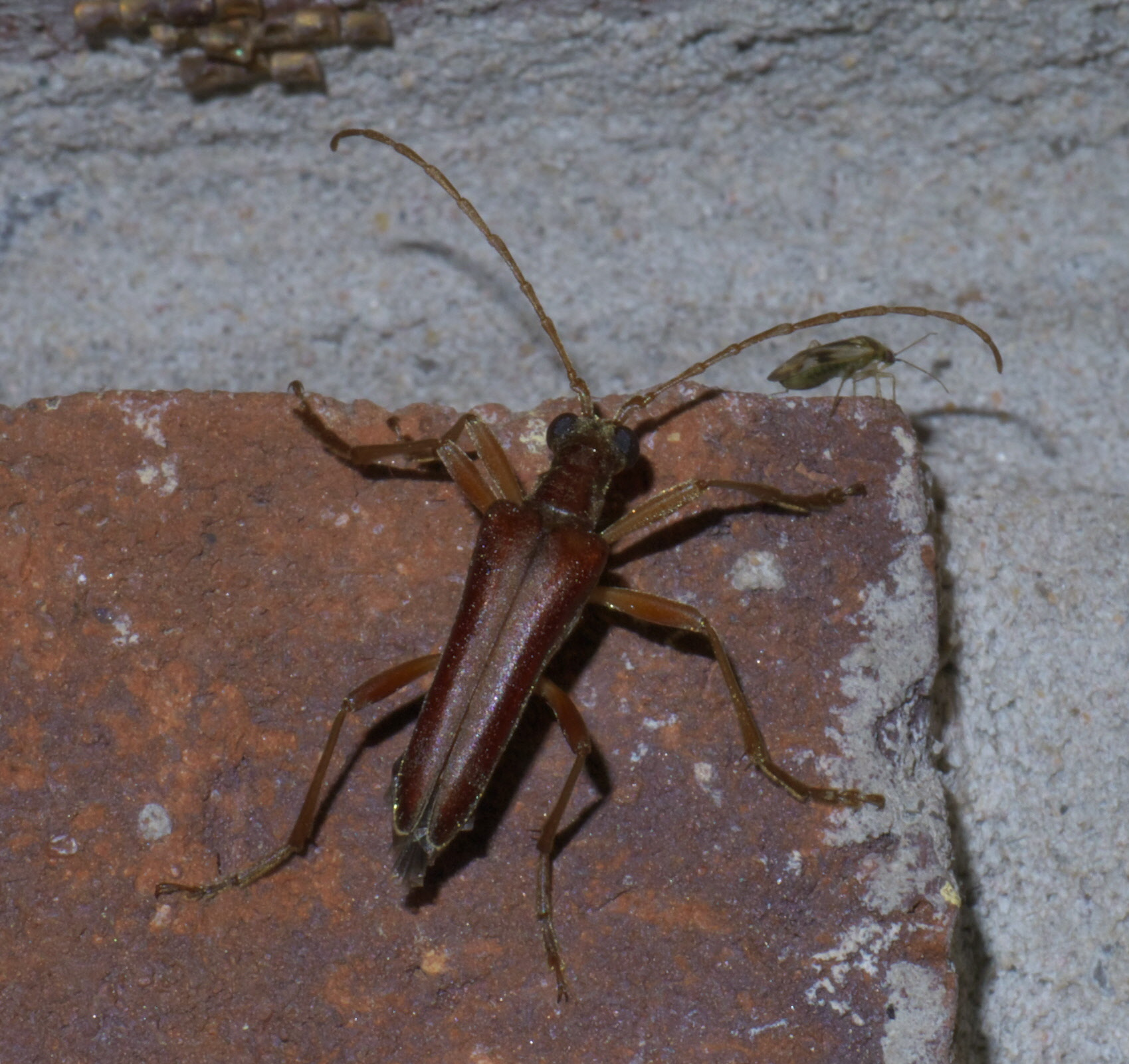

Scientific classification
- Domain: Eukaryota
- Kingdom: Animalia
- Phylum: Arthropoda
- Class: Insecta
- Order: Coleoptera
- Suborder: Polyphaga
- Infraorder: Cucujiformia
- Family: Cerambycidae
- Genus: Stenocorus
- Species: S. cinnamopterus

Binomial name
- Stenocorus cinnamopterus (J.W. Randall)

= Stenocorus cinnamopterus =

Species of beetle

Stenocorus cinnamopterus is a species of beetles in the family Cerambycidae. The species is brown with orange legs. It is found in the northeastern United States.
