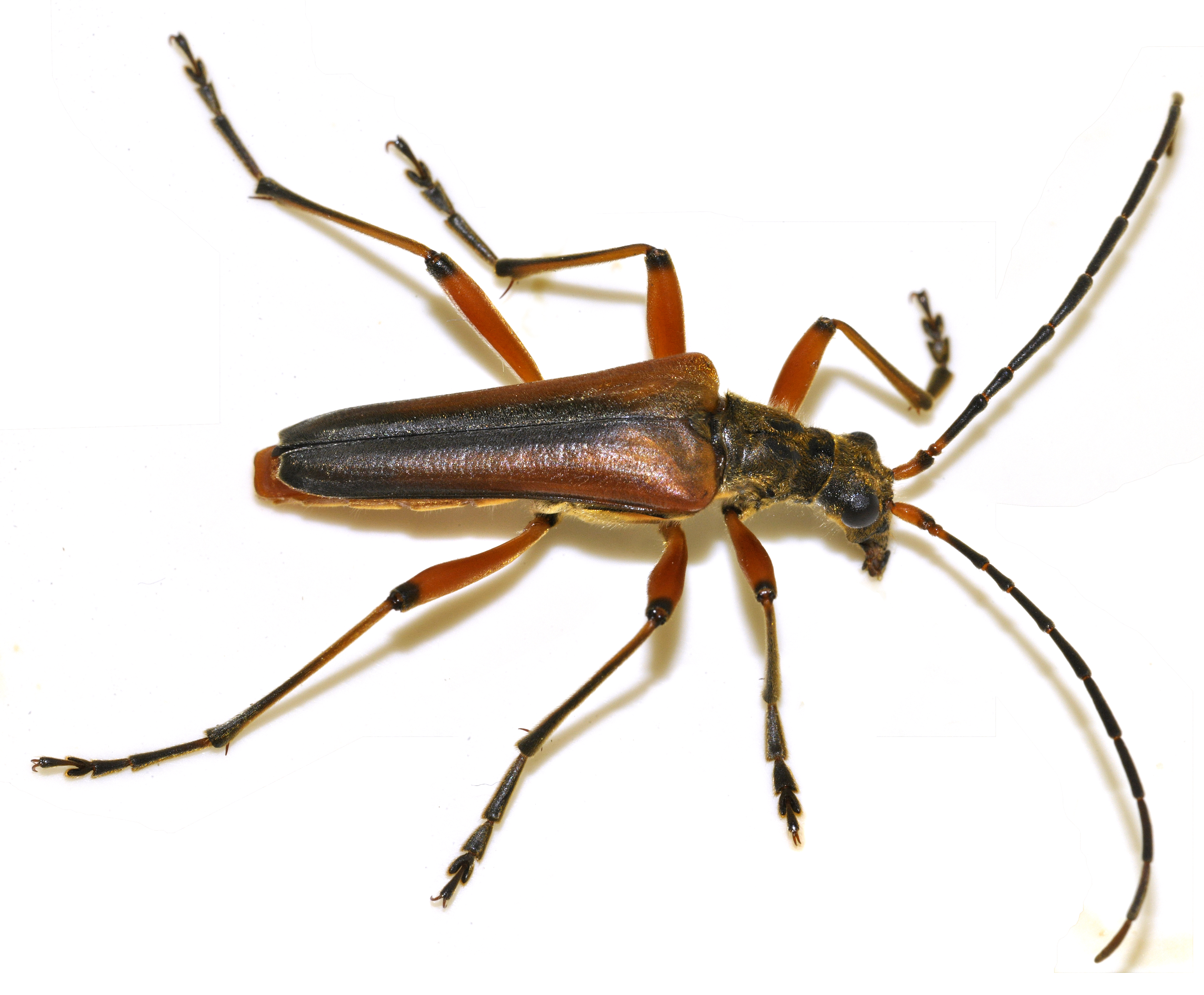
- Stenocorus meridianus

Scientific classification
- Domain: Eukaryota
- Kingdom: Animalia
- Phylum: Arthropoda
- Class: Insecta
- Order: Coleoptera
- Suborder: Polyphaga
- Infraorder: Cucujiformia
- Family: Cerambycidae
- Subfamily: Lepturinae
- Genus: Stenocorus; Fabricius, 1775

= Stenocorus =

Genus of beetles

Stenocorus is a genus of beetles in the family Cerambycidae, containing the following species:

- Stenocorus alteni (Giesbert & Hovore, 1998)
- Stenocorus cinnamopterus (Randall, 1838)
- Stenocorus copei (Linsley & Chemsak, 1972)
- Stenocorus cylindricollis (Say, 1824)
- Stenocorus flavolineatus (LeConte, 1854)
- Stenocorus meridianus (Linnaeus, 1758)
- Stenocorus nubifer (LeConte, 1859)
- Stenocorus obtusus (LeConte, 1873)
- Stenocorus schaumii (LeConte, 1850)
- Stenocorus testaceus (Linsley & Chemsak, 1972)
- Stenocorus trivittatus (Say, 1824)
- Stenocorus vestitus (Haldeman, 1847)
- Stenocorus vittiger (Randall, 1838)
