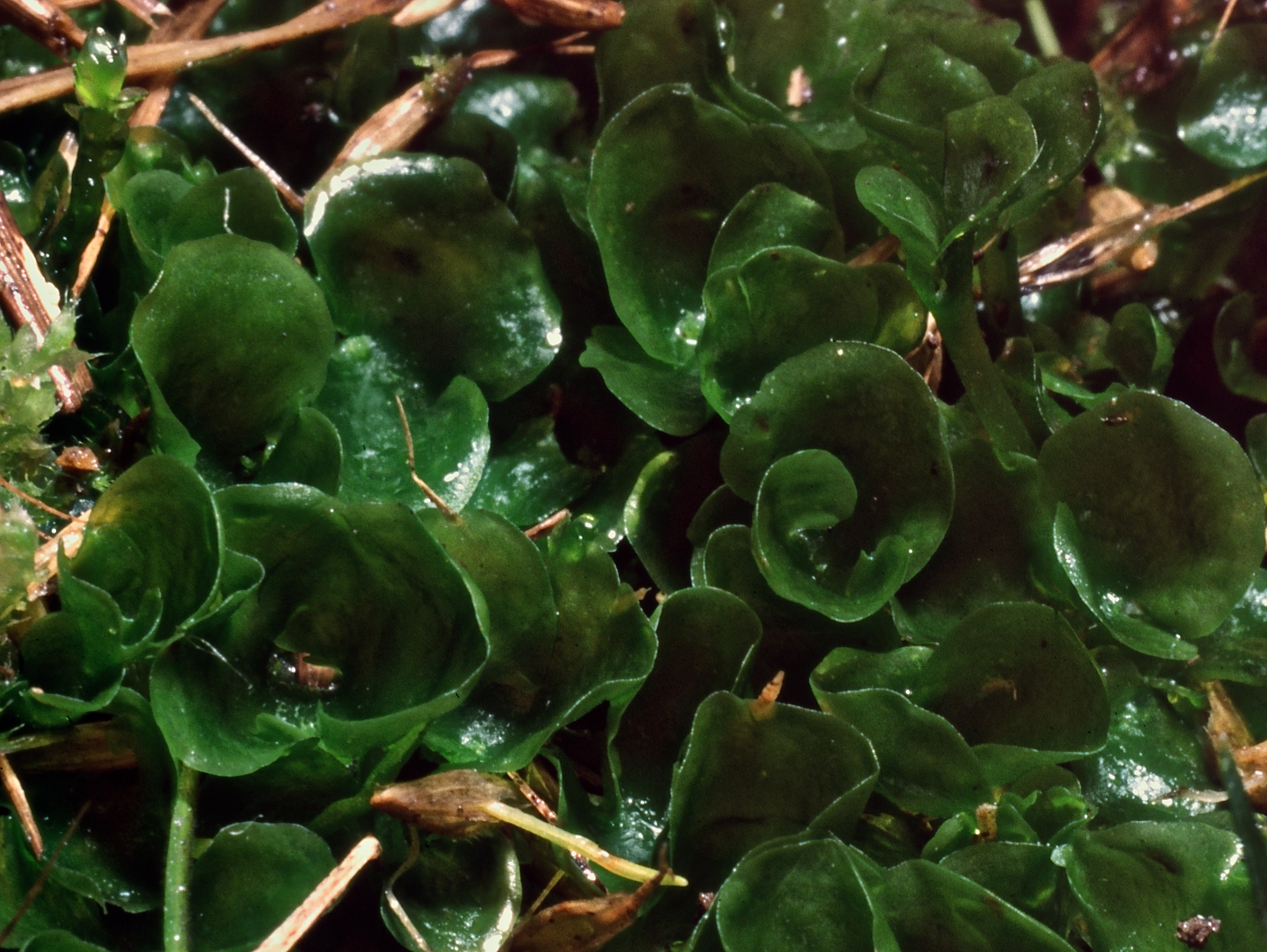
- Phyllothallia nivicola in situ in New Zealand

Scientific classification
- Kingdom: Plantae
- Division: Marchantiophyta
- Class: Jungermanniopsida
- Order: Pallaviciniales; R.M.Schust.
- Family: Phyllothalliaceae; E.A.Hodgs. ex T.Katag.
- Genus: Phyllothallia; E.A.Hodgs.

Species
- Phyllothallia fuegiana Phyllothallia nivicola

= Phyllothallia =

Genus of liverworts

Phyllothallia is a small genus of liverworts of the Southern Hemisphere. It is classified in the order Pallaviciniales and is the only member of the family Phyllothalliaceae within that order. Unlike most members of the Metzgeriales, Phyllothallia has a leafy appearance. The genus has a disjunct distribution, with the species Phyllothallia nivicola found in New Zealand while the other species in the genus, Phyllothallia fuegiana, occurs in Tierra del Fuego.
