= Stenocorus alteni =

Scientific classification
- Domain: Eukaryota
- Kingdom: Animalia
- Phylum: Arthropoda
- Class: Insecta
- Order: Coleoptera
- Suborder: Polyphaga
- Infraorder: Cucujiformia
- Family: Cerambycidae
- Genus: Stenocorus
- Species: S. alteni

Binomial name
- Stenocorus alteni Giesbert & Hovore, 1998

Species of beetle

Stenocorus alteni is a species of beetle in the family Cerambycidae. It was described by Giesbert and Hovore in 1998.
