= Stenocorus nubifer =

Scientific classification
- Kingdom: Animalia
- Phylum: Arthropoda
- Class: Insecta
- Order: Coleoptera
- Suborder: Polyphaga
- Infraorder: Cucujiformia
- Family: Cerambycidae
- Genus: Stenocorus
- Species: S. nubifer

Binomial name
- Stenocorus nubifer Casey, 1913

Species of beetle

Stenocorus nubifer is a species of beetle from the family Cerambycidae. The species are either black or brown coloured.
