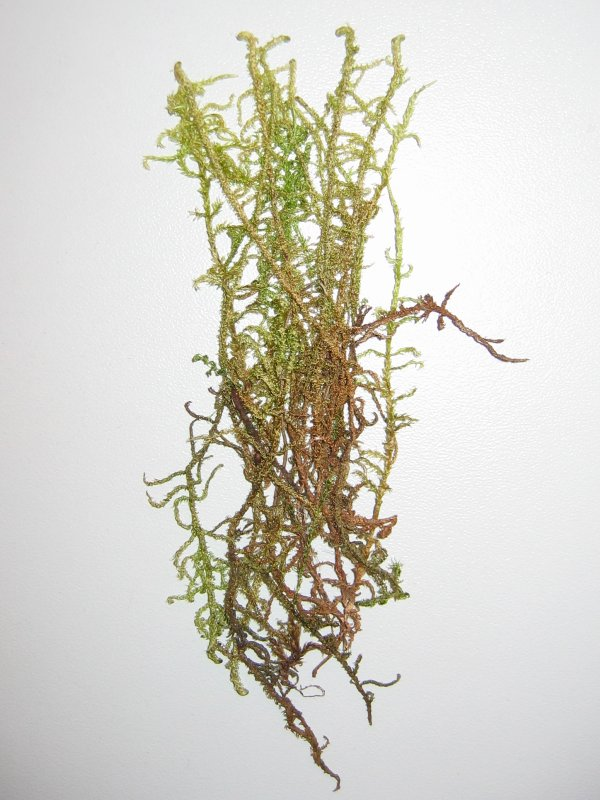
- Hamatocaulis vernicosus

Scientific classification
- Kingdom: Plantae
- Division: Bryophyta
- Class: Bryopsida
- Subclass: Bryidae
- Order: Hypnales
- Family: Amblystegiaceae
- Genus: Hamatocaulis; Hedenäs

= Hamatocaulis =

Genus of mosses

Hamatocaulis is a genus of mosses belonging to the family Amblystegiaceae.

The genus was first described by Lars Hedenäs in 1989.

The genus has cosmopolitan distribution.

Species:

- Hamatocaulis lapponicus
- Hamatocaulis vernicosus
