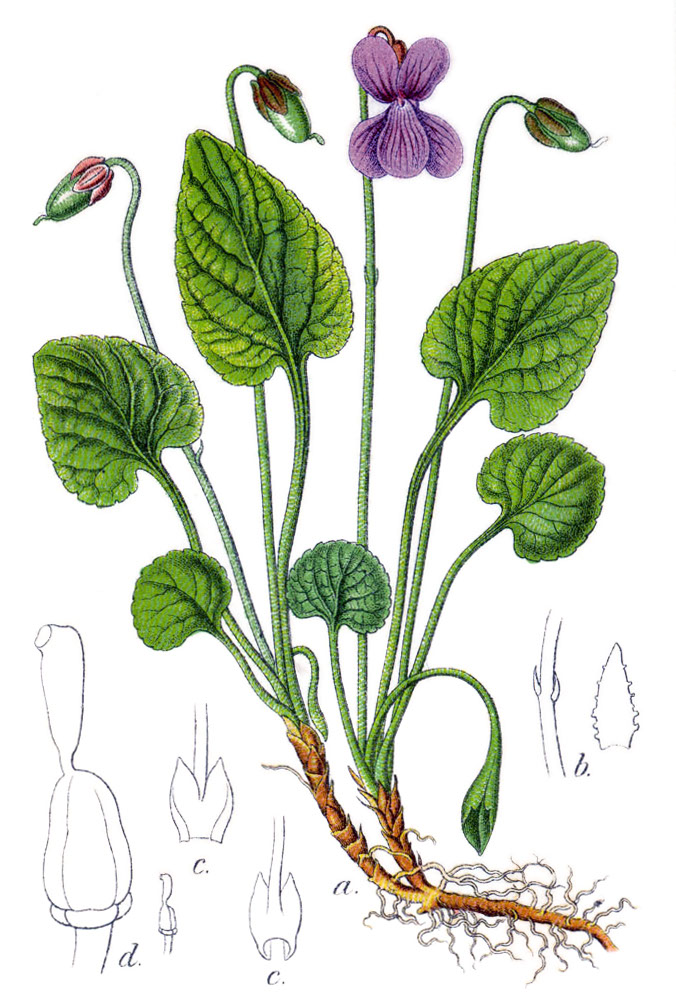

Scientific classification
- Kingdom: Plantae
- Clade: Tracheophytes
- Clade: Angiosperms
- Clade: Eudicots
- Clade: Rosids
- Order: Malpighiales
- Family: Violaceae
- Genus: Viola
- Species: V. uliginosa

Binomial name
- Viola uliginosa Besser

= Viola uliginosa =

Species of flowering plant

Viola uliginosa is a species of flowering plant belonging to the family Violaceae. Common name swamp violet. It is native to Europe.
