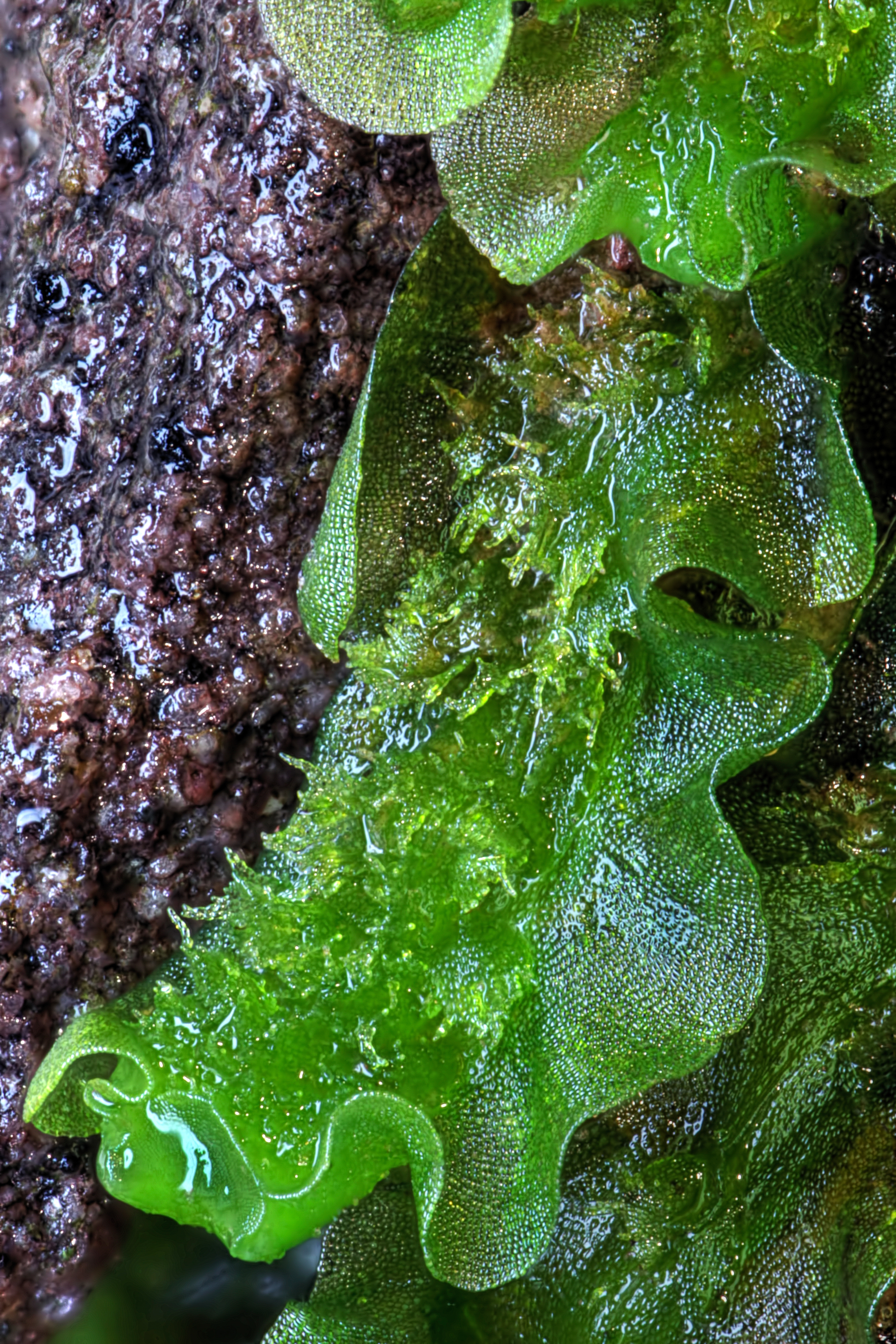
- Moerckia flotoviana (male)

Scientific classification
- Kingdom: Plantae
- Division: Marchantiophyta
- Class: Jungermanniopsida
- Order: Pallaviciniales
- Family: Moerckiaceae; Stotler & Crand.-Stotl., 2007

Genera
- Hattorianthus; Moerckia

= Moerckiaceae =

Family of liverworts

Moerckiaceae is a family of liverworts in the order Pallaviciniales. The plants are thallose, typically organized as a thick central costa (midvein), each side with a broad wing of tissue one cell in thickness. All species are dioicous.
