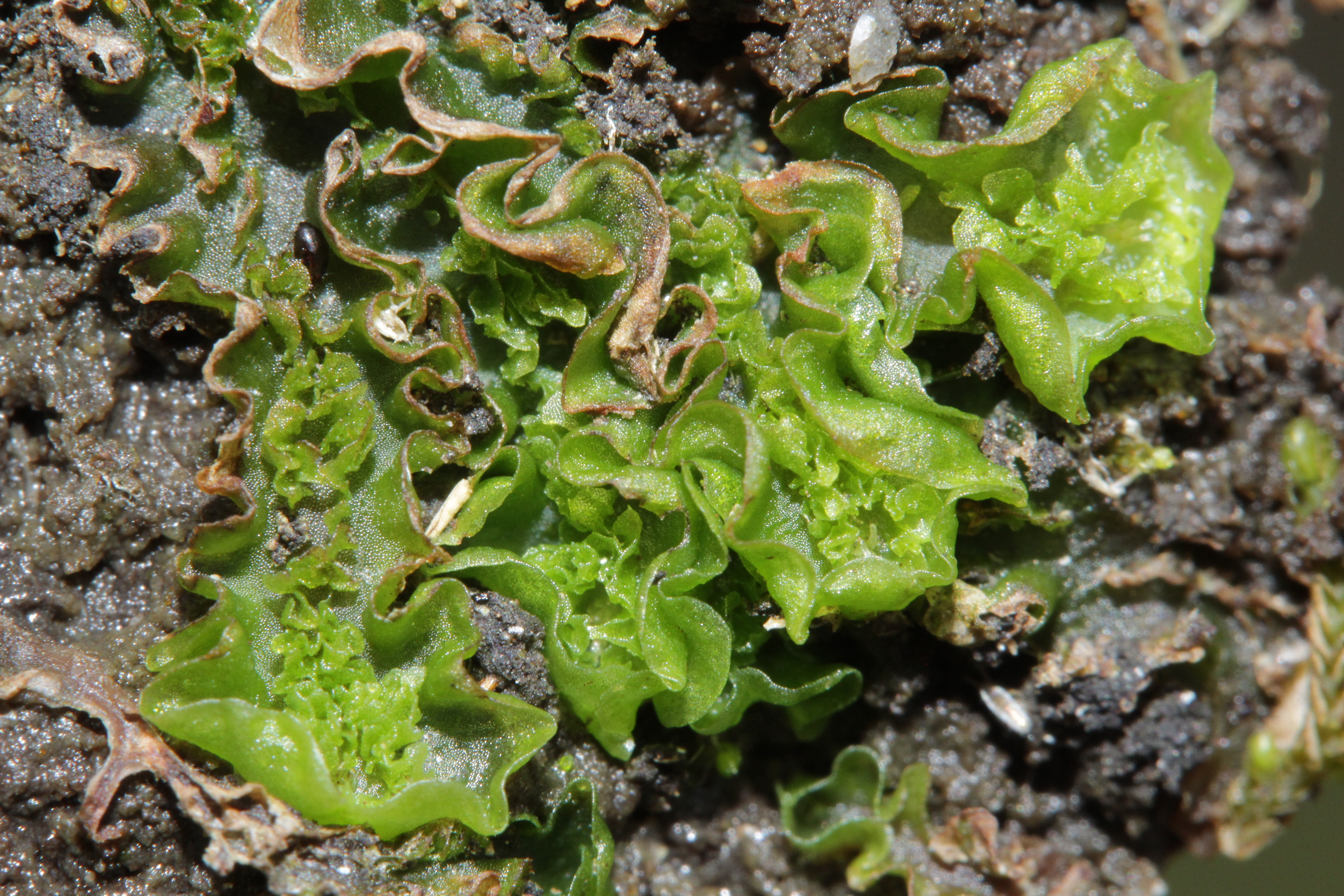
- Moerckia blyttii, also known as Blytt's Ruffwort.

Scientific classification
- Kingdom: Plantae
- Division: Marchantiophyta
- Class: Jungermanniopsida
- Order: Pallaviciniales
- Family: Moerckiaceae
- Genus: Moerckia; Gottsche

= Moerckia =

Genus of liverworts

Moerckia is a genus of liverworts belonging to the family Moerckiaceae.

The genus was first described by Gottsche.

The species of this genus are found in Northern Hemisphere.

Species:

- Moerckia hibernica (Hook.) Gottsche
