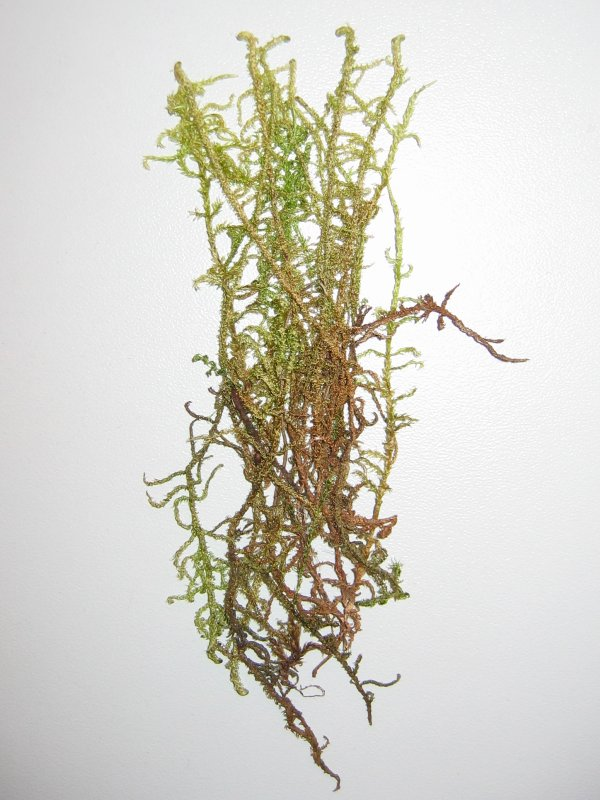

Conservation status
- Vulnerable (IUCN 3.1) (Europe regional assessment)

- Secure (NatureServe)

Scientific classification
- Kingdom: Plantae
- Division: Bryophyta
- Class: Bryopsida
- Subclass: Bryidae
- Order: Hypnales
- Family: Amblystegiaceae
- Genus: Hamatocaulis
- Species: H. vernicosus

Binomial name
- Hamatocaulis vernicosus (Mitt.) Hedenäs

= Hamatocaulis vernicosus =

Species of moss

Hamatocaulis vernicosus, the varnished hook-moss, is a species of moss belonging to the family Amblystegiaceae.

It has cosmopolitan distribution.

== Taxonomy ==
=== Synonyms ===
- Drepanocladus vernicosus (Mitt.) Warnst.
- Drepanocladus vernicosus var. gracile G. Roth
- Hypnum lycopodioides var. genuinum Sanio
- Hypnum pellucidum Wilson ex Jur.
- Hypnum vernicosum var. fluitans Warnst.
- Limprichtia vernicosa (Mitt.) Loeske
- Scorpidium vernicosum (Mitt.) Tuom.
- Stereodon vernicosus Mitt.
