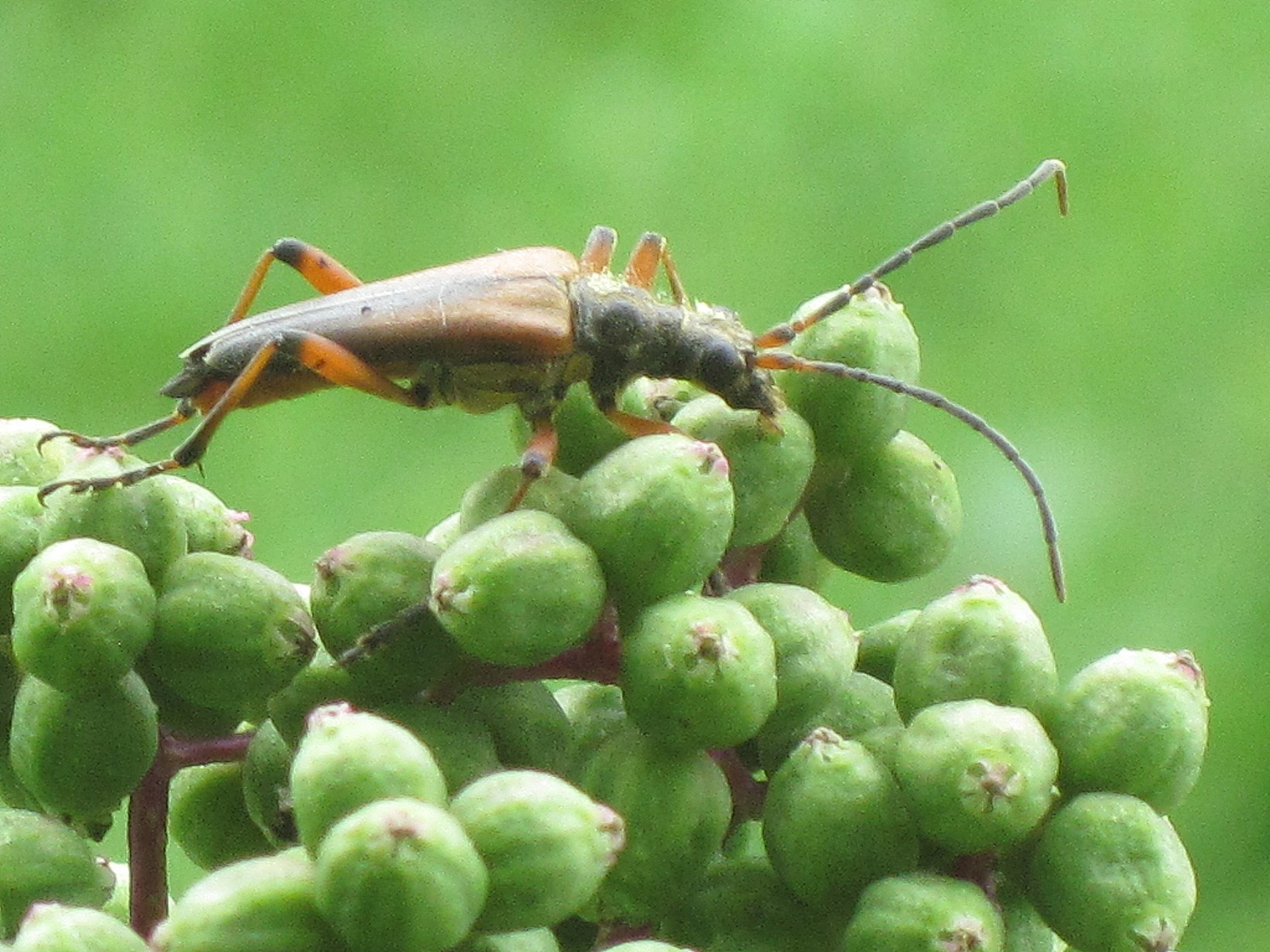

Scientific classification
- Kingdom: Animalia
- Phylum: Arthropoda
- Class: Insecta
- Order: Coleoptera
- Suborder: Polyphaga
- Infraorder: Cucujiformia
- Family: Cerambycidae
- Genus: Stenocorus
- Species: S. meridianus

Binomial name
- Stenocorus meridianus (Linnaeus, 1758)

Synonyms
- Stenocorus meridianus var. laevis Olivier, 1795

= Stenocorus meridianus =

Species of beetle

Stenocorus meridianus is a species of longhorn beetle in the Lepturinae subfamily that can be found anywhere in Europe (except for Faroe Islands, Iceland and Ireland, Malta, and parts of Italy such as San Marino, Sardinia, Sicily, and Vatican City), Caucasus, and Kazakhstan. They are 15–27 millimetres (0.59–1.06 in). The species have brown coloured legs, but can have either black (female) or brown (male) coloured prothorax. They occasionally feed on deciduous trees such as elm, maple, and oak. The species life cycle is from 2–3 years, with a flight time from May–July.

== Life cycle ==
The larvae are born in the damaged timber of diseased tree.
