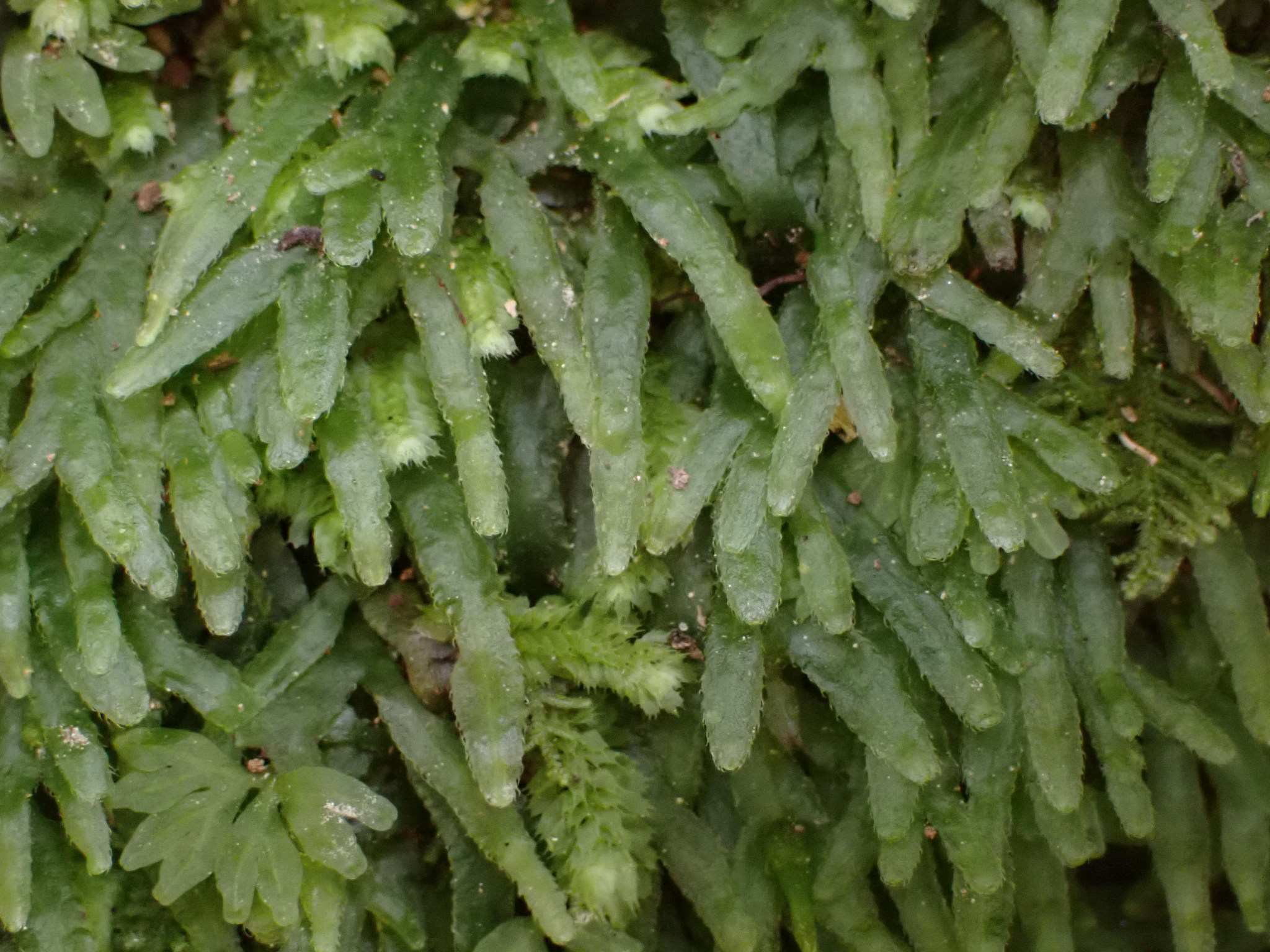
- Prionothallus xiphoides

Scientific classification
- Kingdom: Plantae
- Division: Marchantiophyta
- Class: Jungermanniopsida
- Order: Pallaviciniales
- Family: Pallaviciniaceae; Migula, 1904

Genera
- See text

Synonyms
- List: Blytiaceae; Dilaenaceae; Diplomitriaceae; Pallavicinaceae; Symphyogynaceae

= Pallaviciniaceae =

Family of liverworts

Pallaviciniaceae is a widely distributed family of liverworts in the order Pallaviciniales. All species are thallose, typically organized as a thick central costa (midvein), each side with a broad wing of tissue one cell in thickness. All species are dioicous. The greatest diversity is in Australasia, with some species endemic to that region, though species belonging to the family may be found on every continent except Antarctica.

== Species ==
As accepted by GBIF;

- Greeneothallus Hässel
- Jensenia Lindb.
- Pallavicinia Gray
- Pallavicinius
- Podomitrium Mitt.
- Prionothallus Mamontov, Vilnet & Schäf.-Verw.
- Seppeltia Grolle
- Symphyogyna Nees & Mont.
- Symphyogynopsis Grolle
- Xenothallus R.M.Schust.

== Evolutionary history ==
One of the oldest known bryophytes is Pallaviciniites of the Devonian, discovered in New York. It bears strong similarities to extant thallus liverwort genus Pallavicinia, hence the name.
