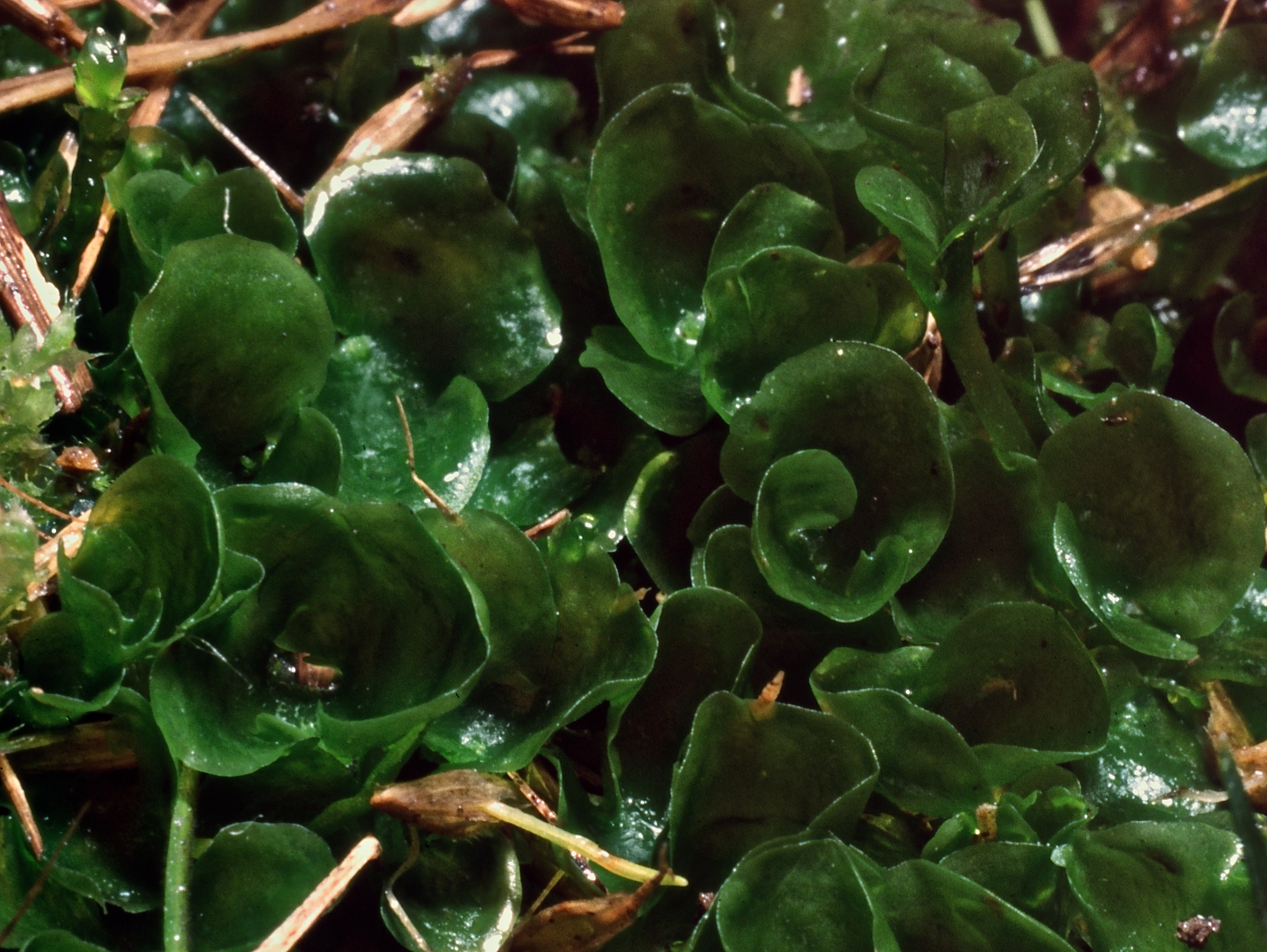
- Phyllothallia nivicola (Phyllothalliaceae).

Scientific classification
- Kingdom: Plantae
- Division: Marchantiophyta
- Class: Jungermanniopsida
- Subclass: Pelliidae
- Order: Pallaviciniales; W.Frey & M.Stech 2005

Families
- Hymenophytaceae Schuster 1963; Moerckiaceae Stotler & Crandall-Stotler 2007; Pallaviciniaceae Migula 1904; Phyllothalliaceae Hodgson 1964; Sandeothallaceae Schuster 1984

= Pallaviciniales =

Order of liverworts

Pallaviciniales is an order of liverworts.

== Taxonomy ==
- Pallaviciniineae Schuster 1984
  - Hymenophytaceae Schuster 1963
    - Hymenophyton Dumortier 1835 [Umbraculum Gottsche 1861 non Schumacher 1817 non Kuntze 1891]
  - Moerckiaceae Stotler & Crandall-Stotler 2007
    - Hattorianthus Schuster & Inoue 1975
    - Moerckia Gottsche 1860 Blyttia Endlicher 1840 non Arnott 1838 non Fries 1839; Cordaea Nees 1833 non Sprengel 1831]
  - Pallaviciniaceae Migula 1904
    - Pallavicinioideae Migula ex Grolle
      - Jensenia Lindberg 1867 [Mittenia Gottsche 1864 non Lindberg 1863; Makednothallus Verdoorn 1932]
      - Pallavicinia Gray 1821 nom. cons. [Pallavicinius (sic); Dilaena Dumortier 1822; Diplolaena Dumortier 1831 non Brown 1814; Hollia Endlicher 1842 non Sieber 1826 non Heynhold 1846; Steetzia Lehmann 1846 non Sonder 1853; Thedenia Fries 1842 non Schimper 1852; Wuestneia Brockmüller 1863 non Auerswald ex Fuckel 1864]
      - Podomitrium Mitten 1855
    - Symphyogynoideae Schuster ex Grolle
      - Greeneothallus Hässel 1980
      - Seppeltia Grolle 1986
      - Symphyogyna Nees & Montagne 1836 [Strozzia Trevisan 1877; Viviania Raddi 1822 non Cavanilles 1804 non Willd. ex Less. non Colla 1825 non Rafinesque 1814 non Rondani 1861; Viviana (sic) Raddi 1822 non (sic) Bigot 1888 non (sic) Colla non Koken 1896]
      - Symphyogynopsis Grolle 1986
      - Xenothallus Schuster 1963
  - Sandeothallaceae Schuster 1984
    - Sandeothallus Schuster 1982
- Phyllothalliineae Schuster 1967
  - Phyllothalliaceae Hodgson 1964
    - Phyllothallia Hodgson 1964
