= P. elegans =

P. elegans may refer to any of the following species:

- Phaps elegans, the brush bronzewing, a bird
- Phlebolepis elegans, a prehistoric jawless fish
- Piperia elegans, the elegant piperia, coast piperia, hillside rein orchid or hillside bogorchid, an orchid native to western North America
- Plagiorchis elegans, a parasitic trematode (fluke)
- Platycercus elegans, the crimson rosella, a parrot native to eastern and south eastern Australia which has been introduced to New Zealand and Norfolk Island
- Platycraniellus elegans, an extinct species of non-mammalian synapsids
- Platypodium elegans, the graceful platypodium, a large tree found in the Neotropics
- Plestiodon elegans, the five-striped blue-tailed skink or Shanghai skink, a lizard found in East Asia
- Poiretia elegans, a flowering plant in the legume family (Fabaceae) found in Brazil
- Polyscias elegans, the celery wood, a rainforest tree found in eastern Australia
- Pomatias elegans, the round-mouthed snail, a small land snail
- Prioniodus elegans, a conodont
- Protaetia elegans, a flower chafer found in Taiwan
- Psychopyge elegans, a trilobite
- Ptychosperma elegans, the Alexander palm, solitaire palm, cabbage palm or elegant palm, a palm endemic to Australia
- Parasagitta elegans, an arrow worm

== Synonyms ==
- Pagurus elegans, a synonym of Calcinus elegans, a hermit crab
- Palaeocasuarius elegans, a synonym for Megalapteryx didinus, the Upland moa, an extinct bird endemic to New Zealand
- Paramecolabus elegans, a synonym of Catalabus elegans, a beetle found in India
- Periclimenes elegans, a synonym of Cuapetes elegans, a shrimp
- Phyracaces elegans, a synonym for Cerapachys elegans, an ant found in Australia
- Pleroma elegans, a synonym of Tibouchina elegans, an ornamental plant native to Brazil
- Pleurothallis elegans, a synonym for Stelis roseopunctata, an orchid
- Pococera elegans, a synonym of Cacozelia elegans, a snout moth found in Venezuela
- Pterodactylus elegans, a synonym of Ctenochasma elegans, a pterosaur
