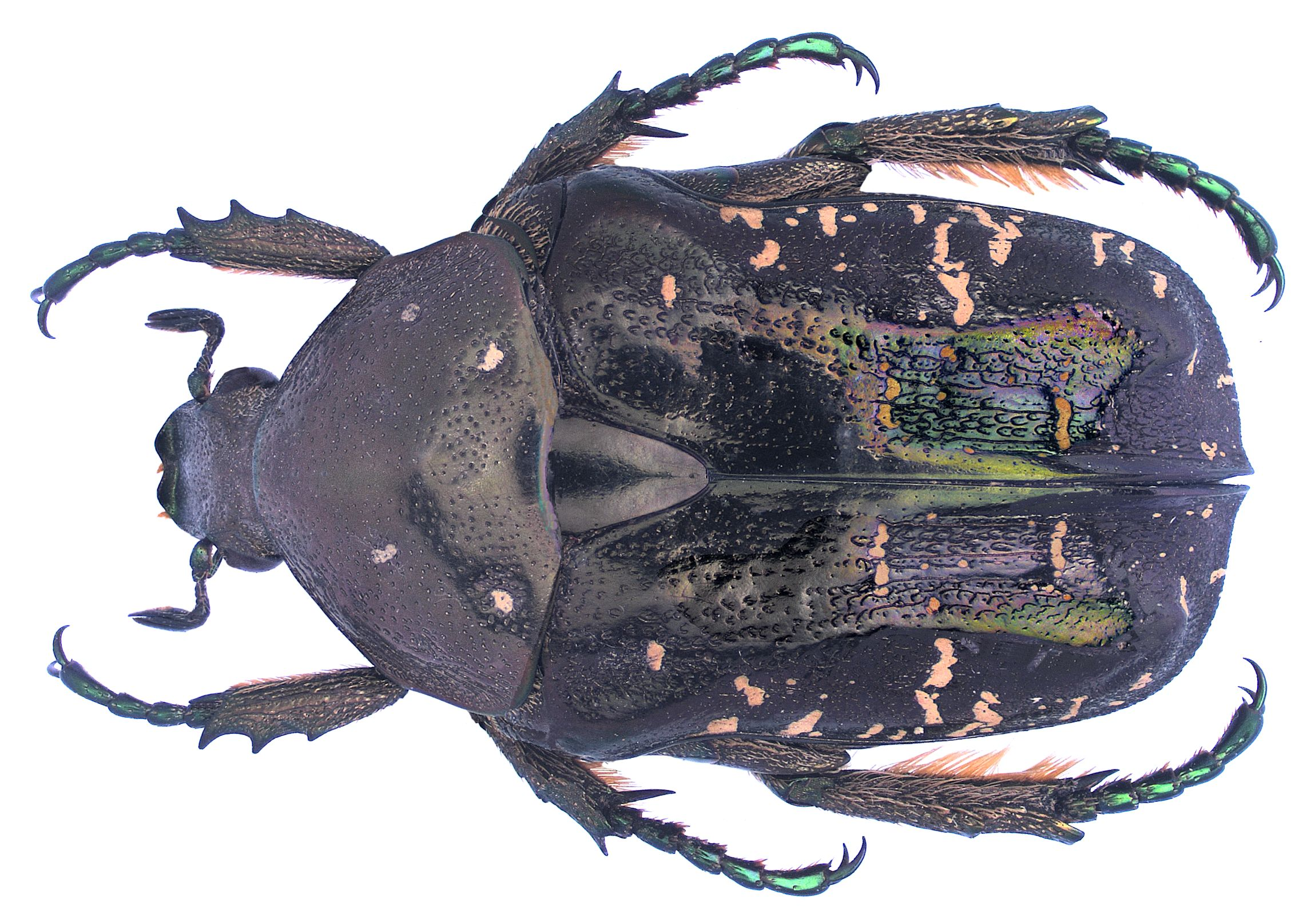
- Protaetia orientalis

Scientific classification
- Kingdom: Animalia
- Phylum: Arthropoda
- Clade: Pancrustacea
- Class: Insecta
- Order: Coleoptera
- Suborder: Polyphaga
- Infraorder: Scarabaeiformia
- Family: Scarabaeidae
- Genus: Protaetia
- Subgenus: Calopotosia; Reitter, 1899

Species
- Protaetia descarpentriesi Ruter, 1978; Protaetia inquinata Arrow, 1913; Protaetia lewisi Janson, 1888; Protaetia orientalis Gory & Percheron, 1833

= Calopotosia =

Subgenus of beetles

Calopotosia is a subgenus of scarab beetles in the genus Protaetia, subfamily Cetoniinae. Species are found in Asia.
