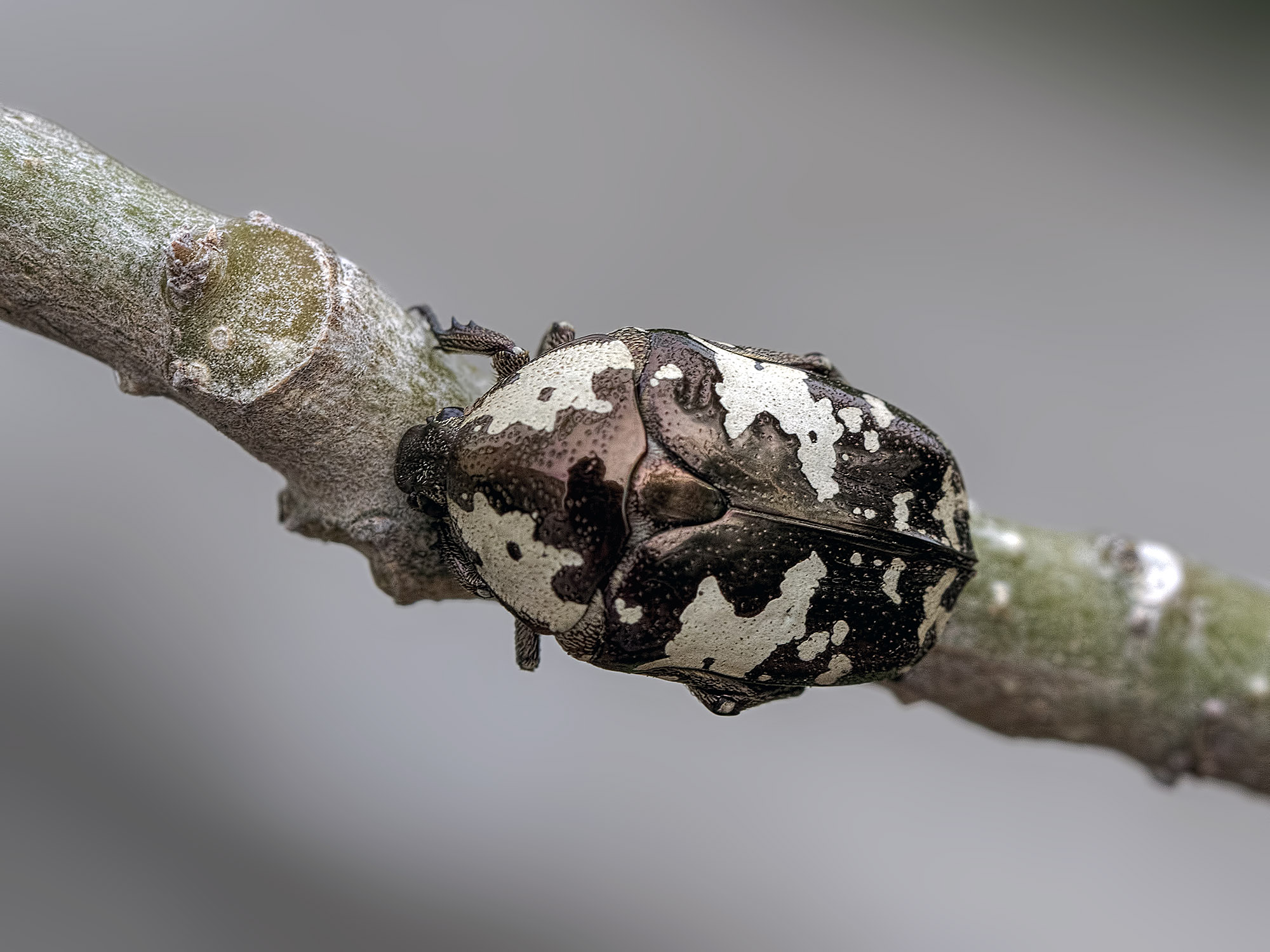

Scientific classification
- Kingdom: Animalia
- Phylum: Arthropoda
- Class: Insecta
- Order: Coleoptera
- Suborder: Polyphaga
- Infraorder: Scarabaeiformia
- Family: Scarabaeidae
- Genus: Protaetia
- Species: P. aurichalcea

Binomial name
- Protaetia aurichalcea (Fabricius, 1775)

Synonyms
- Cetonia aurichalcea Fabricius, 1775; Cetonia maculata Fabricius, 1781; Scarabaeus antheus Voet, 1779

= Protaetia aurichalcea =

Species of beetle

Protaetia aurichalcea is a species of flower-chafer beetle in the family Scarabaeidae. It is found in Asia.

The ground colour of the beetle is bronze with white markings on the elytra. Males have spiny apical elytral angles showing up as a raised ridge along the elytral suture. Like other flower-beetles, adults visit flowers but they are known to sometimes visit beehives and feed on honey and pollen collected.

== Biology ==
Adults are known to form aggregations on crops such as maize, and sorghum from earheads.

A nematode, Teratorhabditis andrassyi has been observed to show ectophoretic association with the beetle.

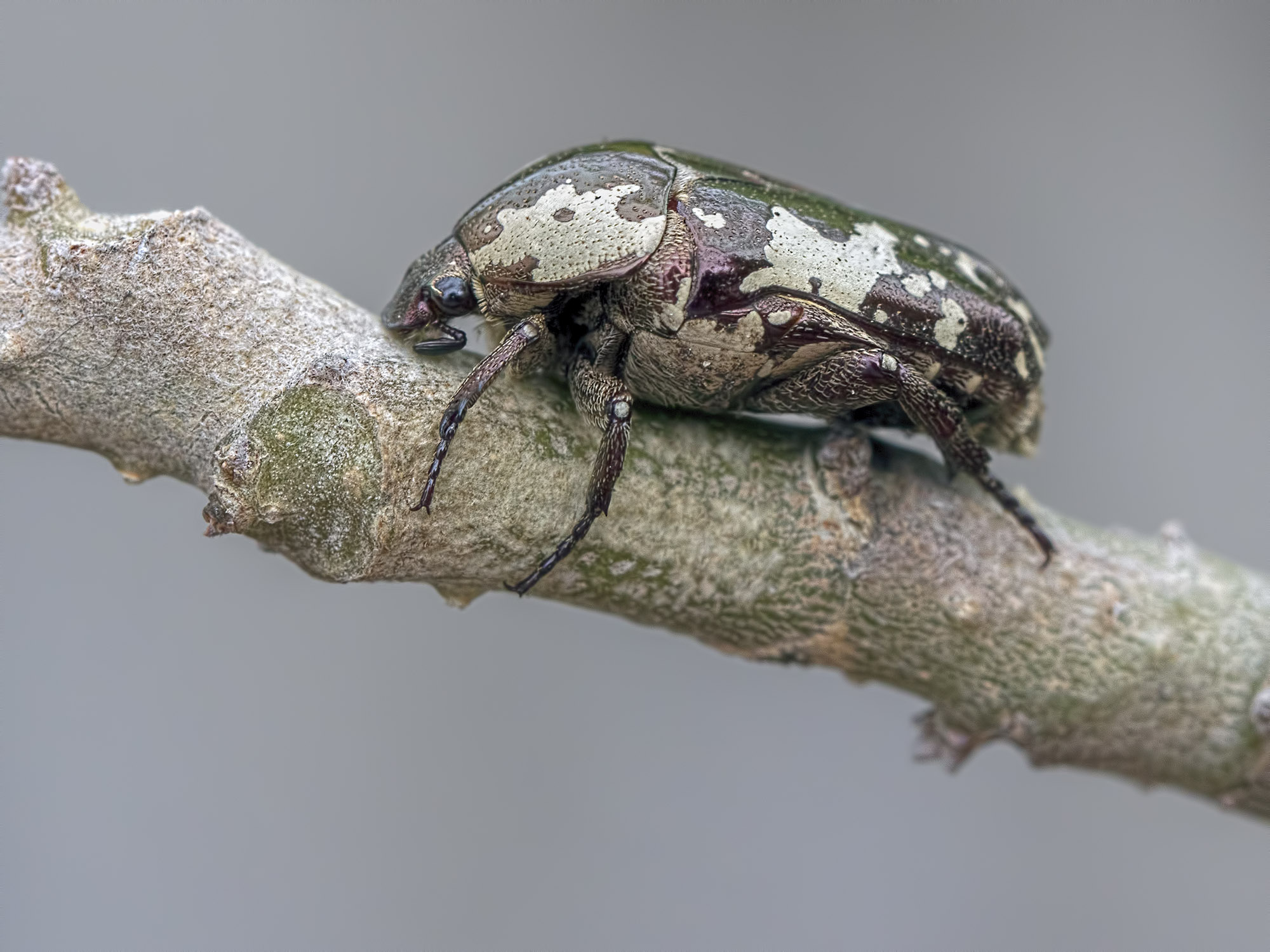

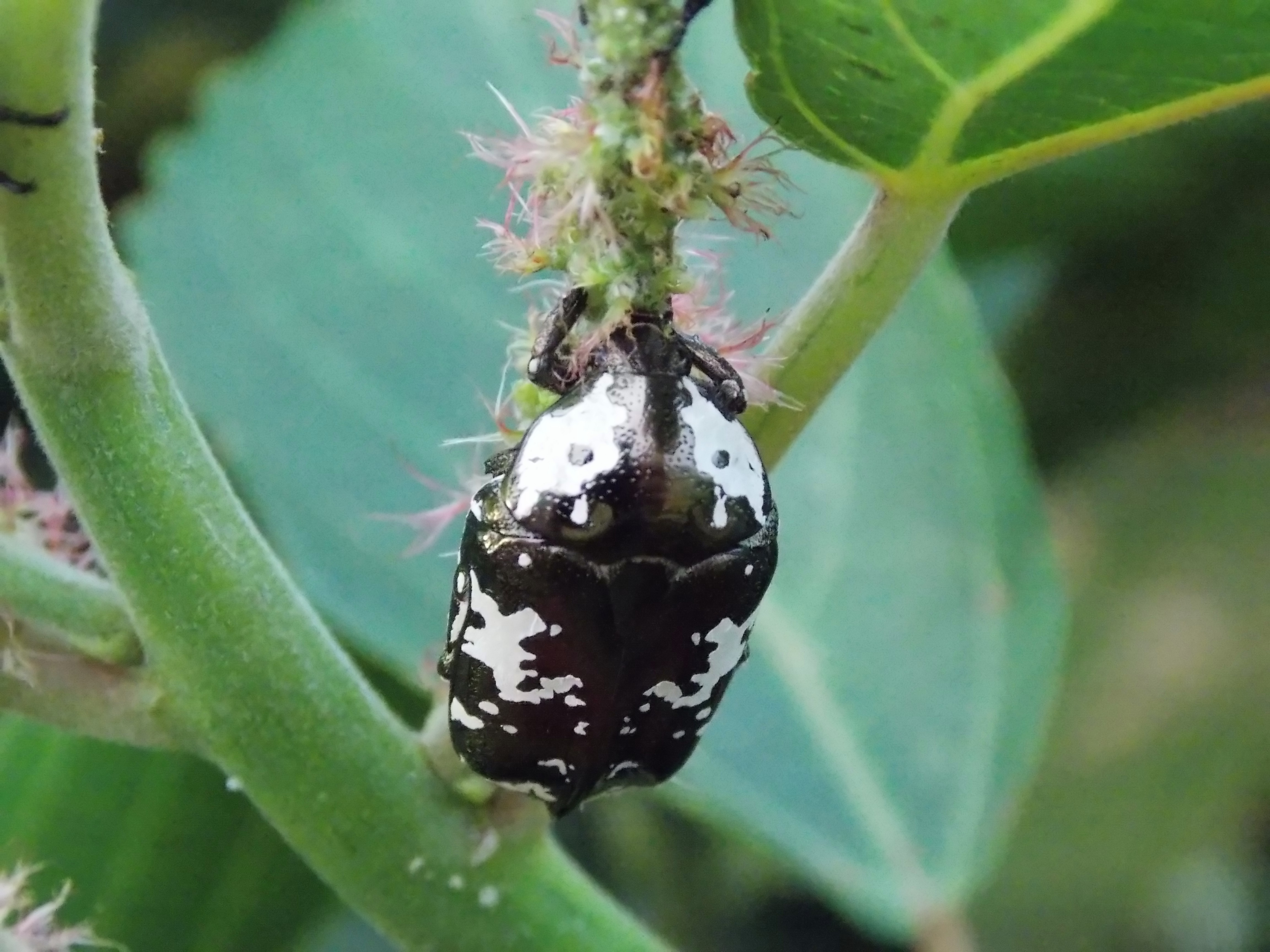

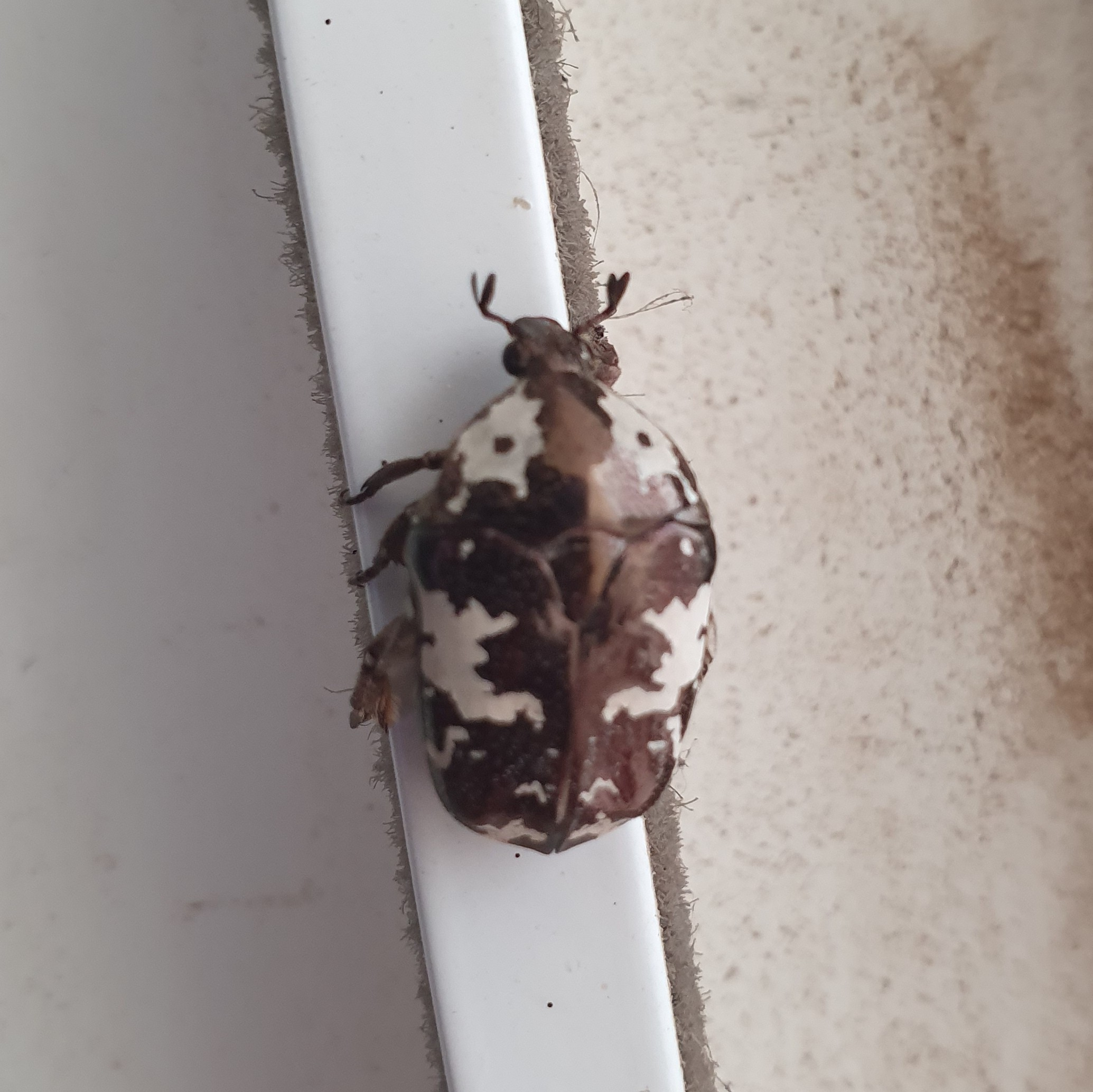

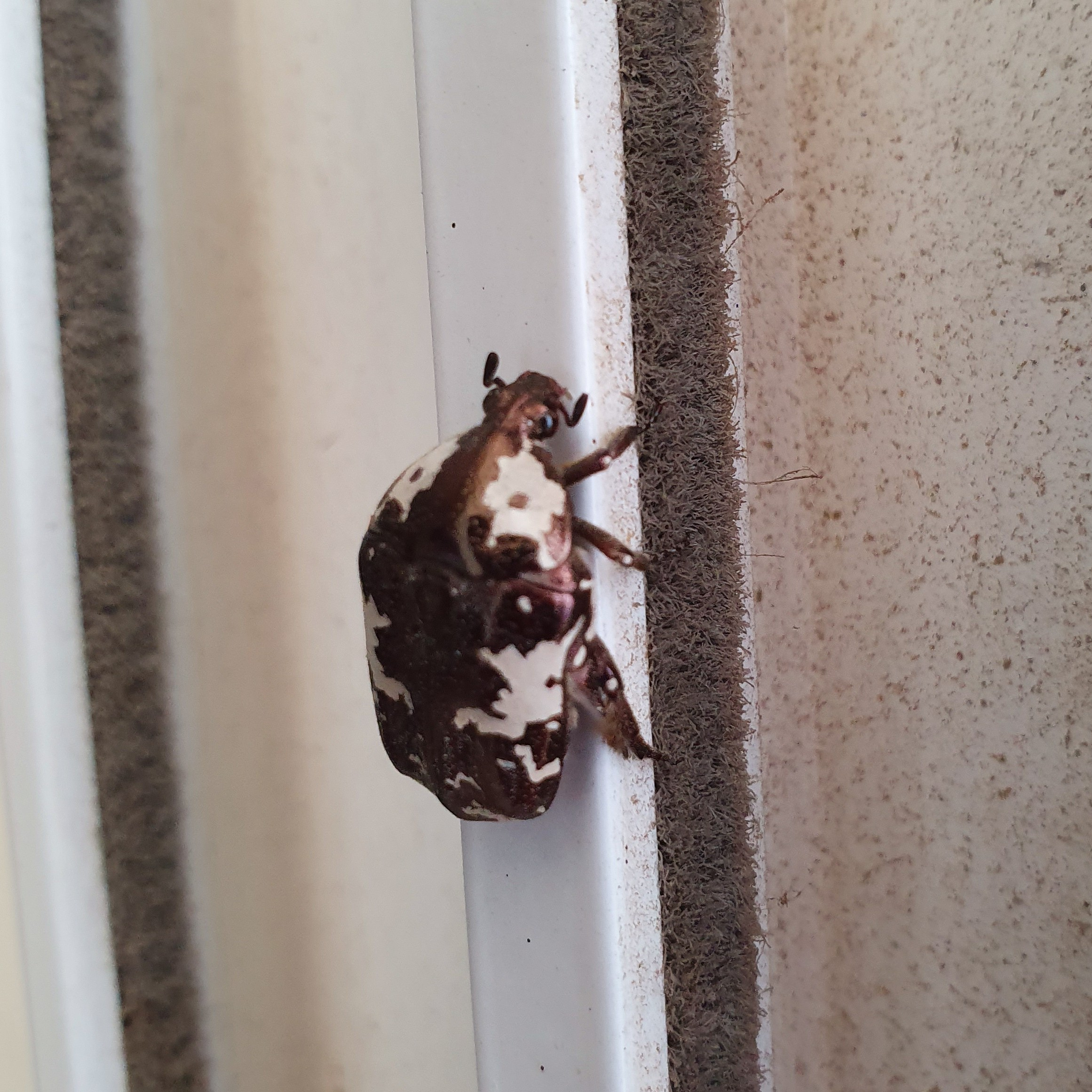
