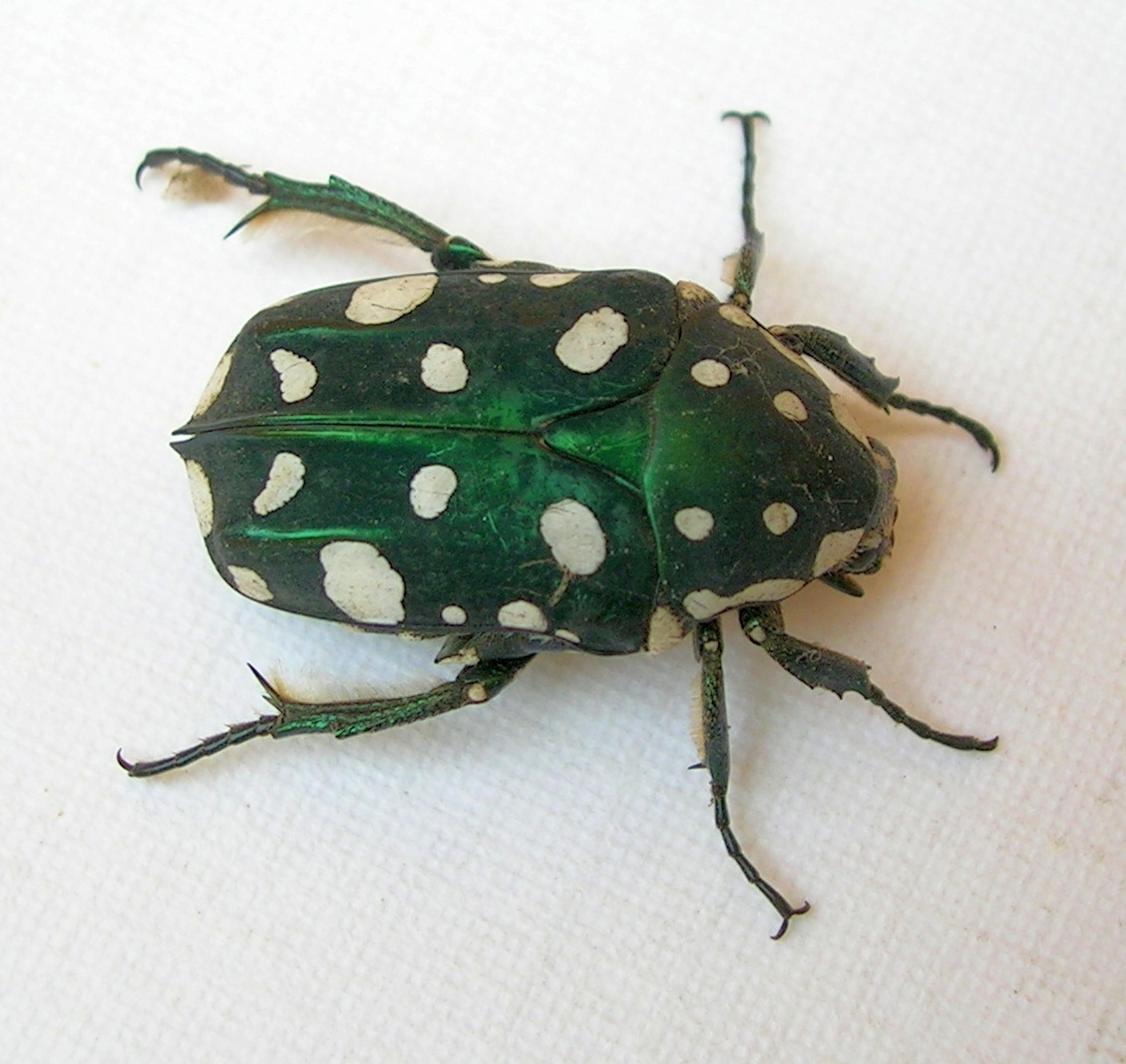

Scientific classification
- Domain: Eukaryota
- Kingdom: Animalia
- Phylum: Arthropoda
- Class: Insecta
- Order: Coleoptera
- Suborder: Polyphaga
- Infraorder: Scarabaeiformia
- Family: Scarabaeidae
- Genus: Protaetia
- Species: P. alboguttata

Binomial name
- Protaetia alboguttata (Vigors, 1826)

Synonyms
- Cetonia alboguttata Vigors, 1826; Cetonia saundersii Bainbridge, 1842

= Protaetia alboguttata =

Species of beetle

Protaetia alboguttata is a species of flower chafer found in India, Nepal and Sri Lanka.

== Description ==
They are polyphagous beetle known to destroy brinjal plantations where adults feed on the tender shoots, flowers and flower buds. Attacks are more common in the early morning. In 2000, they were found from maize tassels during rainy season with characteristic aggregation habit. Apart from them, adult aggregations are also found from ripe fruits of Ficus carica, Averrhoa carambola and Carissa carandus.

In 1966, this species was split with a new species described as wiebesi found in Sri Lanka and peninsular India. The difference between wiebesi and alboguttata are claimed to be in the genitalia, the shape of the hind leg, hairiness of hind leg, and the shade of the background colour - greener in alboguttata, violet-black in wiebesi.

== Gallery ==
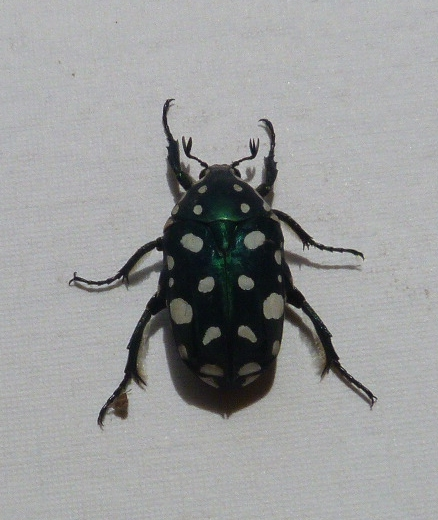

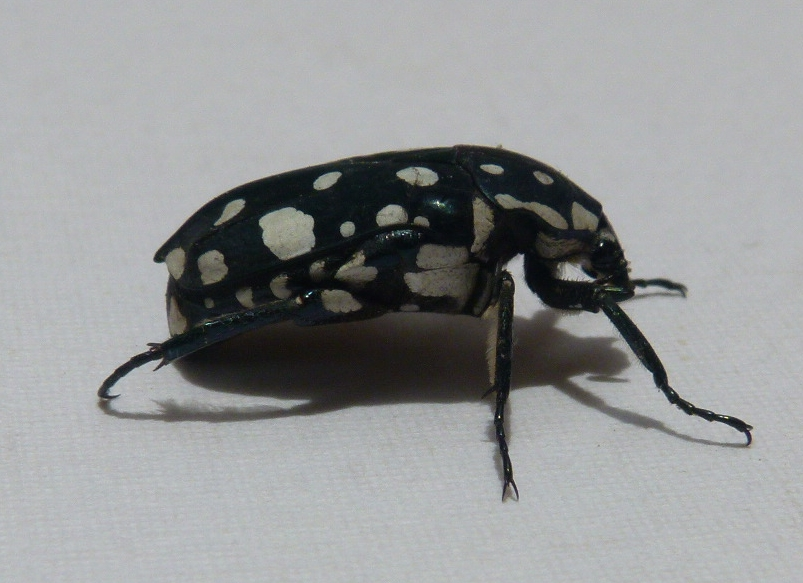
