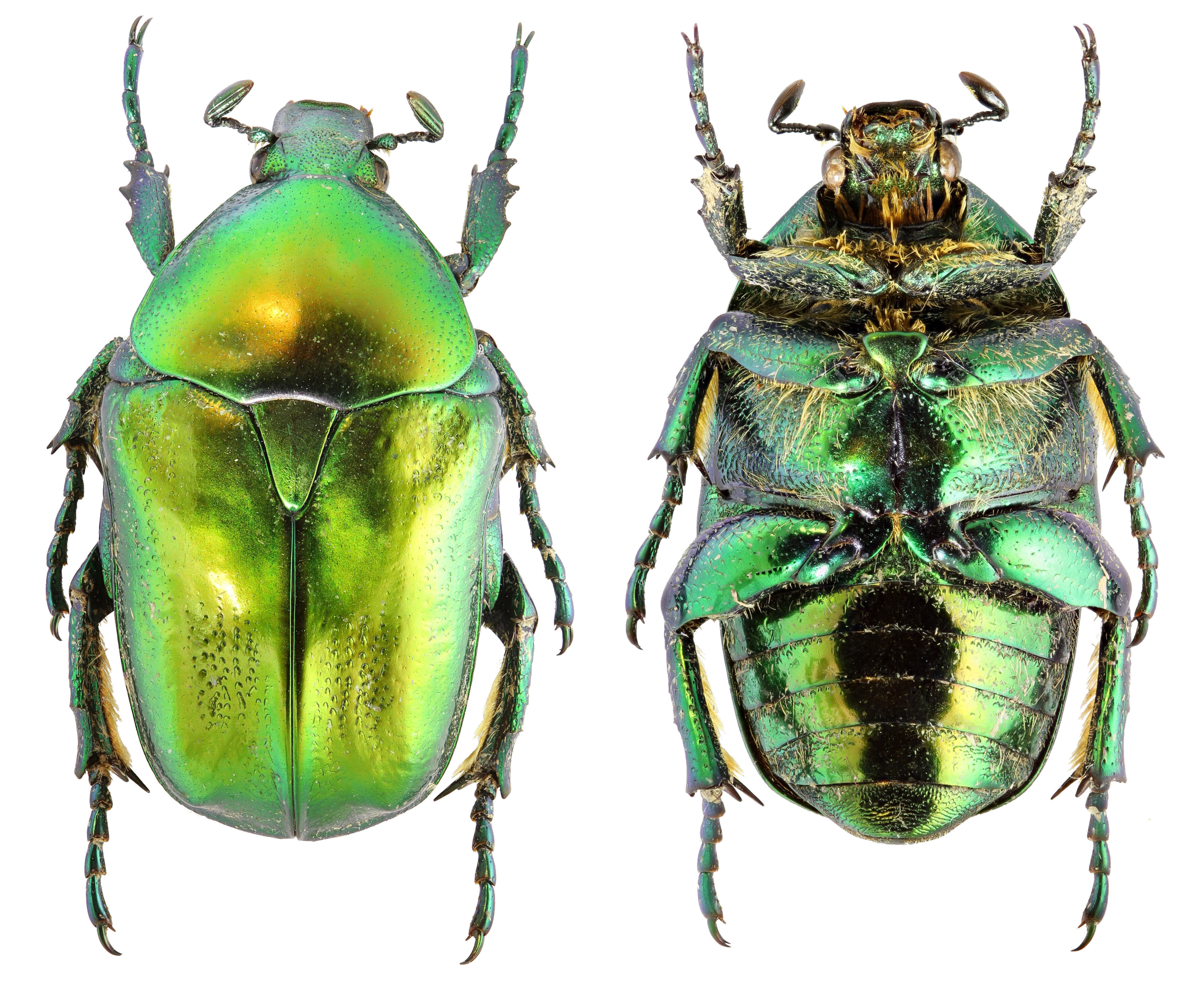

Scientific classification
- Kingdom: Animalia
- Phylum: Arthropoda
- Clade: Pancrustacea
- Class: Insecta
- Order: Coleoptera
- Suborder: Polyphaga
- Infraorder: Scarabaeiformia
- Family: Scarabaeidae
- Genus: Protaetia
- Subgenus: Eupotosia
- Species: P. affinis

Binomial name
- Protaetia affinis Andersch, 1797

Synonyms
- Cetonia affinis Andersch, 1797; Potosia affinis (Andersch, 1797); Eupotosia affinis (Andersch, 1797); Cetonia aenea Illiger, 1806 nec Füssli, 1778; Cetonia quercus Bonelli, 1807

= Protaetia affinis =

Species of beetle

Protaetia affinis is a species of beetle of the family Scarabaeidae.

== Distribution ==
It is distributed across Southern and Central Europe. It prefers continental climate. Adults first appear in early spring and remain active through summer. Like other members of the genus Protaetia, Protaetia affinis belongs to the scarab beetles, a group characterised by their distinctive antennae, which terminate in a series of plate-like segments. These structures are characteristic of the family Scarabaeidae and are useful features for identifying scarab beetles.

== Appearance ==
Protaetia affinis is usually 25–30 mm long, with a thick-set body. Both sides of its body are usually metallic emerald, however blue, violet, red, black and bicolor variations have been described as subspecies. The elytra have very small punctures, and no horizontal striae. The legs are also green, with white stripes.

== Lifestyle ==
Females lay clutches of 4-7 eggs. Larvae develop in cavities in tree branches, where they feed on decaying plant matter. Adults feed on sap from trees, seeming to prefer fruit trees. Occasionally they can be found on flowering plants.
