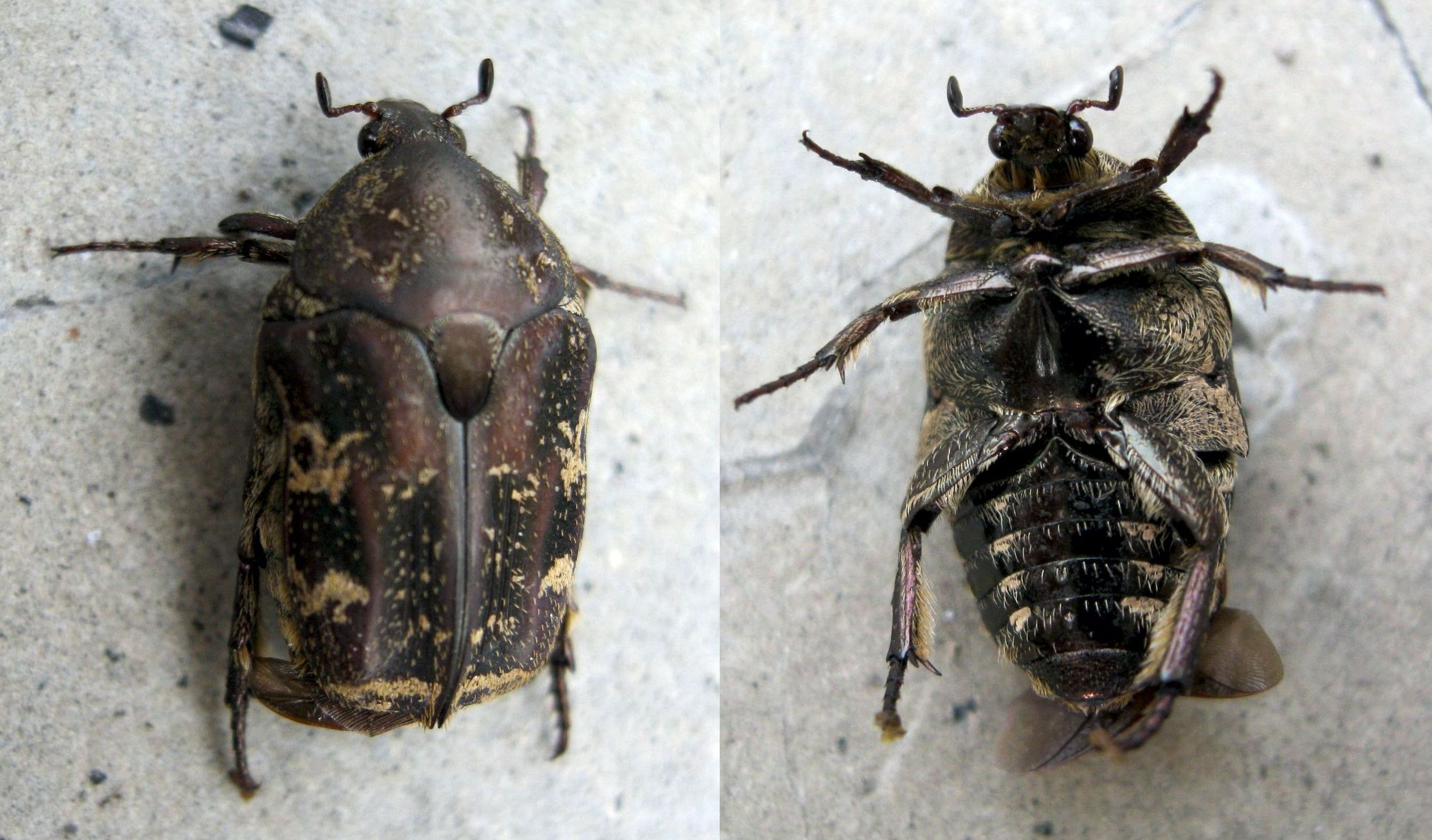
- Protaetia fusca in Yogyakarta

Scientific classification
- Kingdom: Animalia
- Phylum: Arthropoda
- Clade: Pancrustacea
- Class: Insecta
- Order: Coleoptera
- Suborder: Polyphaga
- Infraorder: Scarabaeiformia
- Family: Scarabaeidae
- Genus: Protaetia
- Species: P. fusca

Binomial name
- Protaetia fusca (Herbst, 1790)

Synonyms
- Cetonia fusca Herbst, 1790; Cetonia atomaria Fabricius, 1801; Cetonia fictilis Newman, 1838; Cetonia mandarina Lichtenstein, 1796; Protaetia bourgoini Paulian, 1959; Protaetia mandarinea Burmeister, 1842 (misspelling); Protaetia taiwana Niijima & Matsumura, 1923

= Protaetia fusca =

Species of beetle

Protaetia fusca is a beetle belonging to the Cetoniinae subfamily.

== Gallery ==
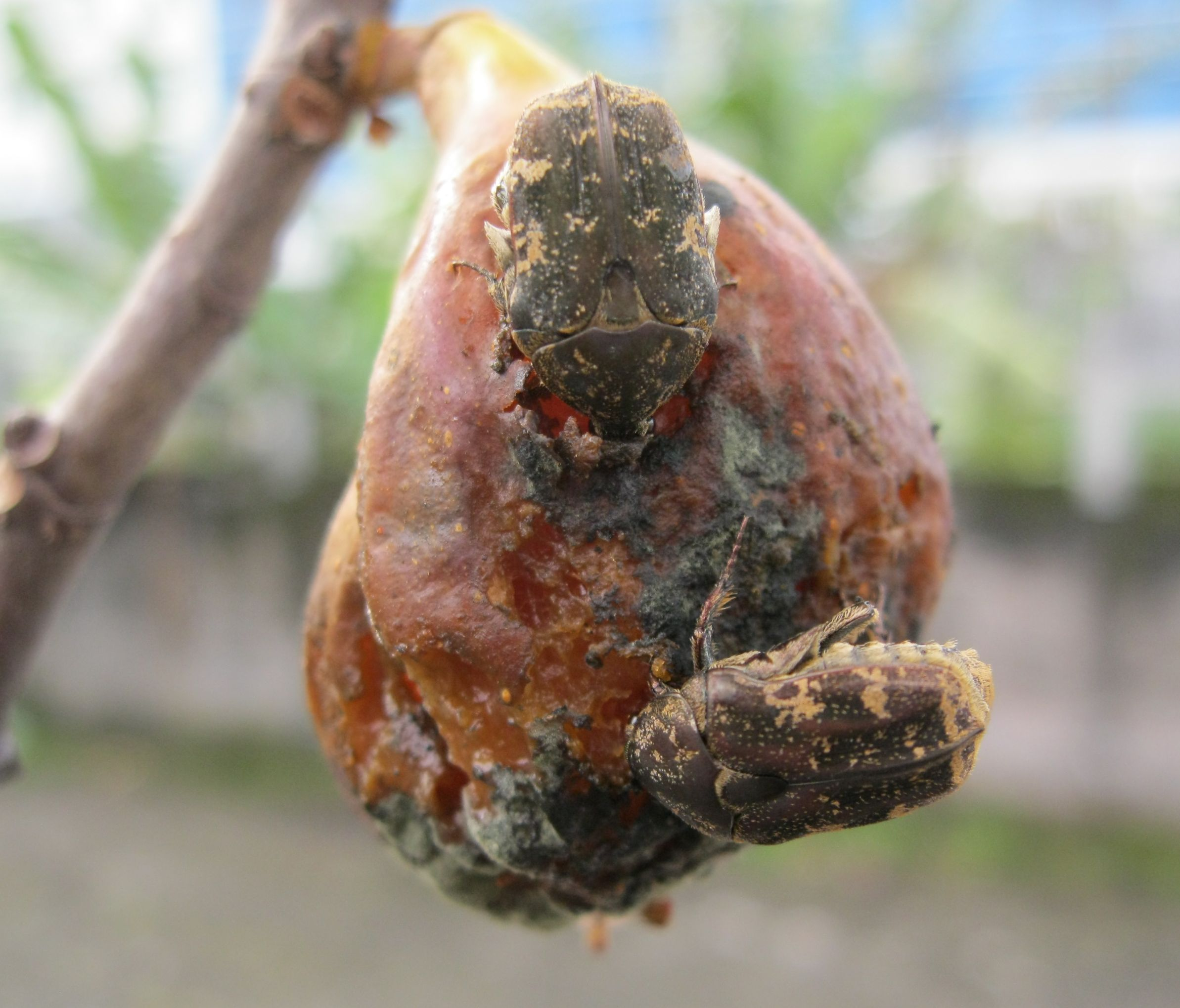
P. fusca feeding on figs fruit in Java, Indonesia
