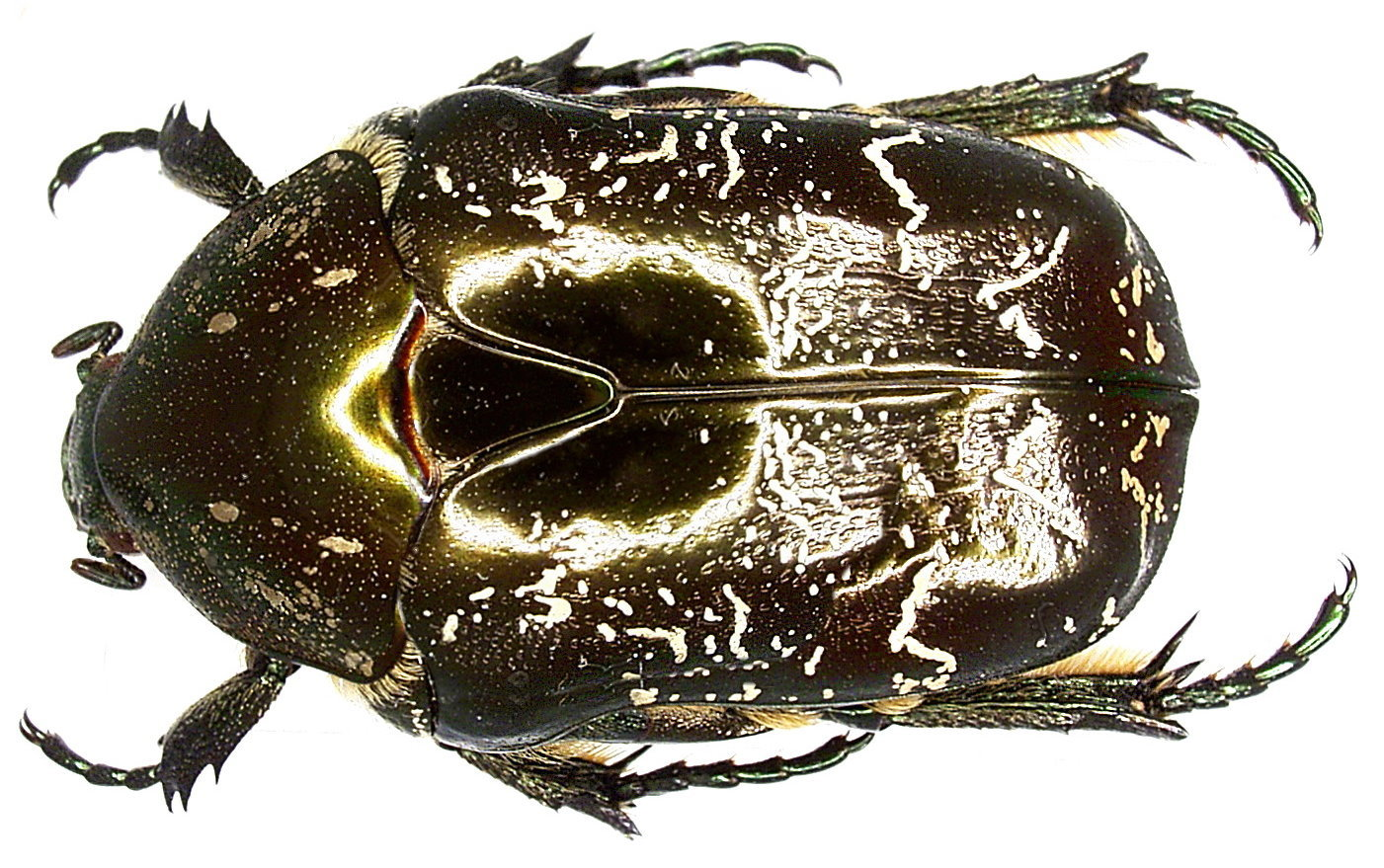

Scientific classification
- Kingdom: Animalia
- Phylum: Arthropoda
- Class: Insecta
- Order: Coleoptera
- Suborder: Polyphaga
- Infraorder: Scarabaeiformia
- Family: Scarabaeidae
- Genus: Protaetia
- Species: P. lugubris

Binomial name
- Protaetia lugubris (Herbst, 1786)

= Protaetia lugubris =

Species of beetle

Protaetia lugubris is a species of beetle belonging to the family Cetoniidae.

It is native to Europe and Japan.

Synonym:

- Netocia lugubris
