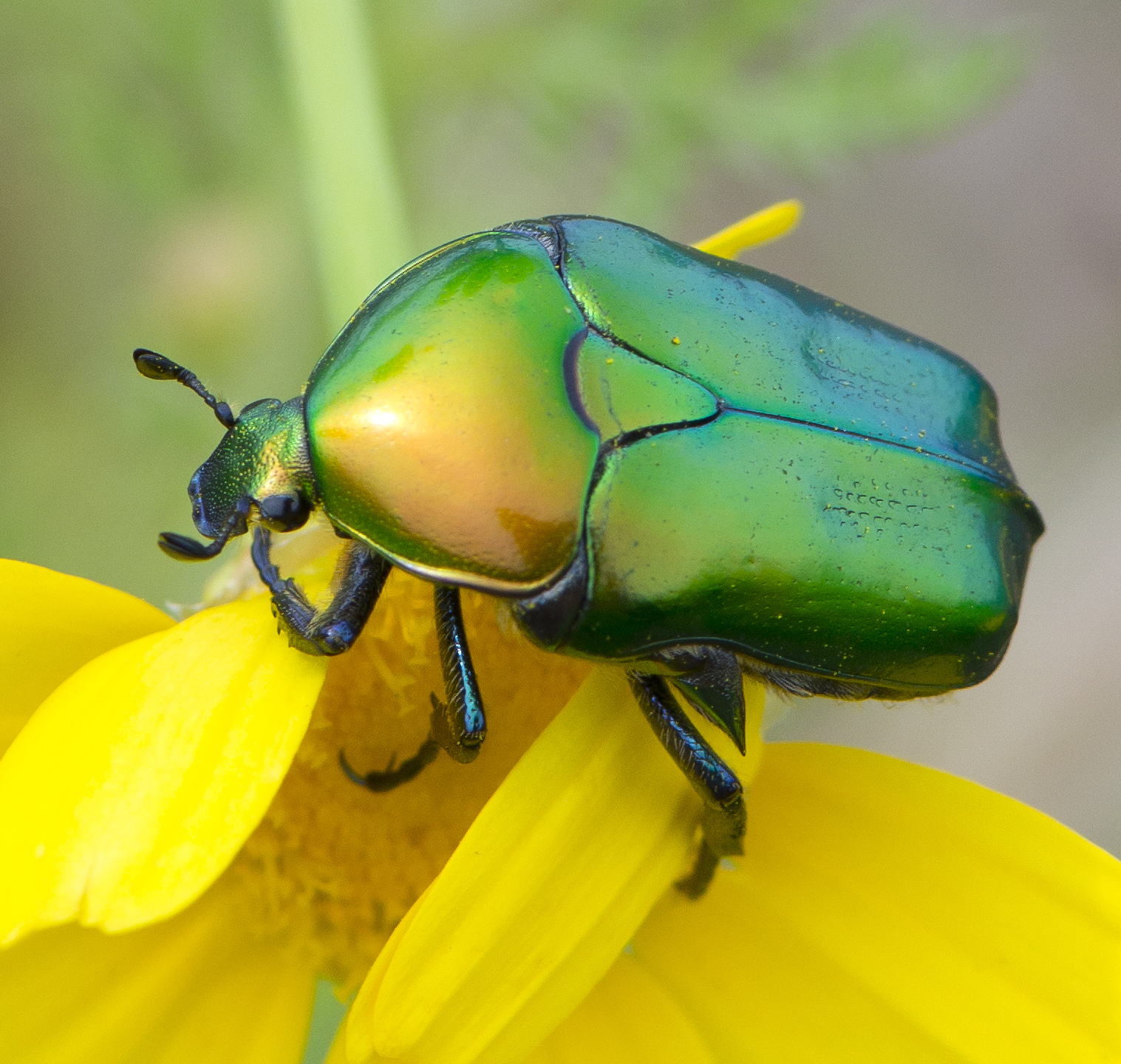
- Protaetia cuprea ignicollis

Scientific classification
- Kingdom: Animalia
- Phylum: Arthropoda
- Clade: Pancrustacea
- Class: Insecta
- Order: Coleoptera
- Suborder: Polyphaga
- Infraorder: Scarabaeiformia
- Family: Scarabaeidae
- Genus: Protaetia
- Species: P. cuprea

Binomial name
- Protaetia cuprea (Fabricius, 1775)

Synonyms
- Cetonia cuprea Fabricius, 1775

= Protaetia cuprea =

Species of chafer

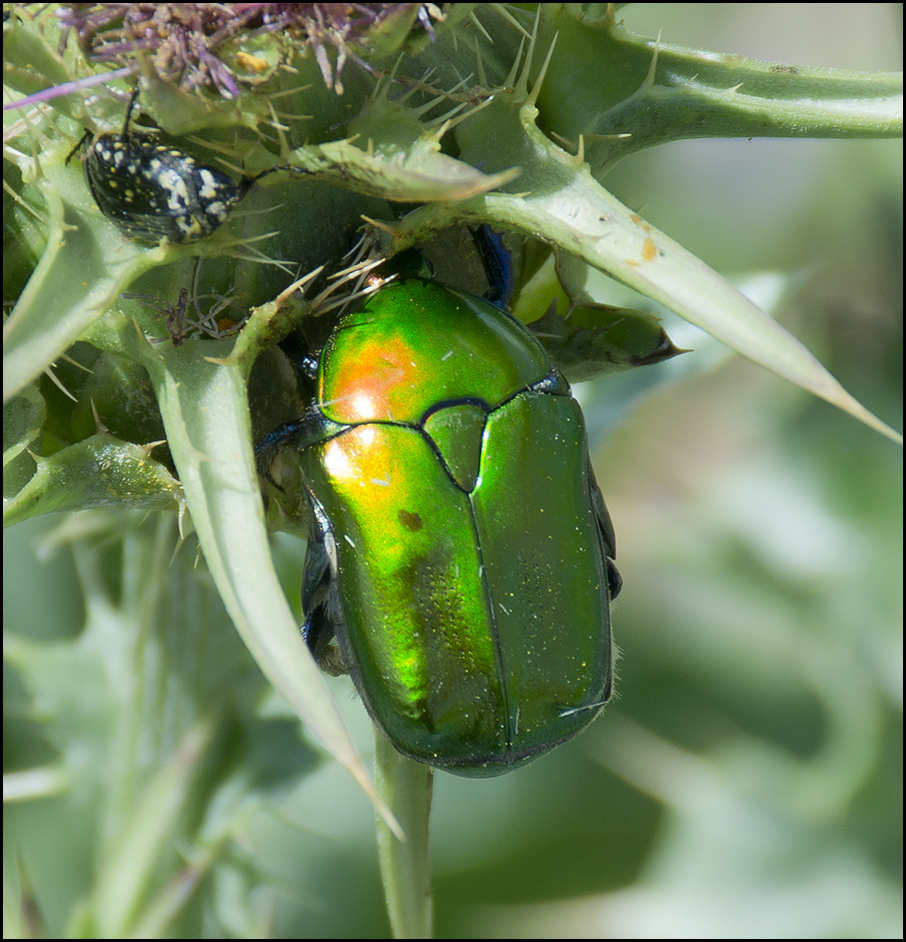
Copper chafer in Israel

Protaetia cuprea, also known as the copper chafer, is a species of chafer in the family Scarabaeidae. This species is also known as the rose chafer and has a wide geographic distribution, extending from Canary Islands, Portugal, and Spain to the east towards Vladivostok in the Russian Far East, Mongolia, and North China. This species forages for pollen from flowers and fruits, such as apples, from trees. However, since fruit is scarce in the spring and winter, they only transition from a diet of pollen to a diet of fruits in the summer. Since pollen is richer in proteins and lipids than carbohydrates, while fruit is richer in carbohydrates, they are able to travel longer when on a fruit diet; this is due to their increased aerobic performance when fueled by high-carbohydrate content.

This beetle is well-known for its flight ability, a skill that supports its foraging behavior. It has swift maneuvering ability and strong precision when landing on flowers and plants; it is able to do this due to the elasticity and mechanisms this beetle's wings possess.

== Geographic range ==
The beetle species P. cuprea has an extensive geographic distribution across various regions, showcasing its adaptability and diverse habitat preferences. P. cuprea is found all over Europe and Asia. From the Canary Islands, Portugal, and Spain, the beetle's range extends eastward to Vladivostok in the Russian Far East and further encompasses Mongolia and North China. Its presence in the Middle East is notable, with populations in Turkey, the Levant, northern Egypt, and Iran. Further, the species is also documented in South Asia, specifically in Pakistan and Nepal.

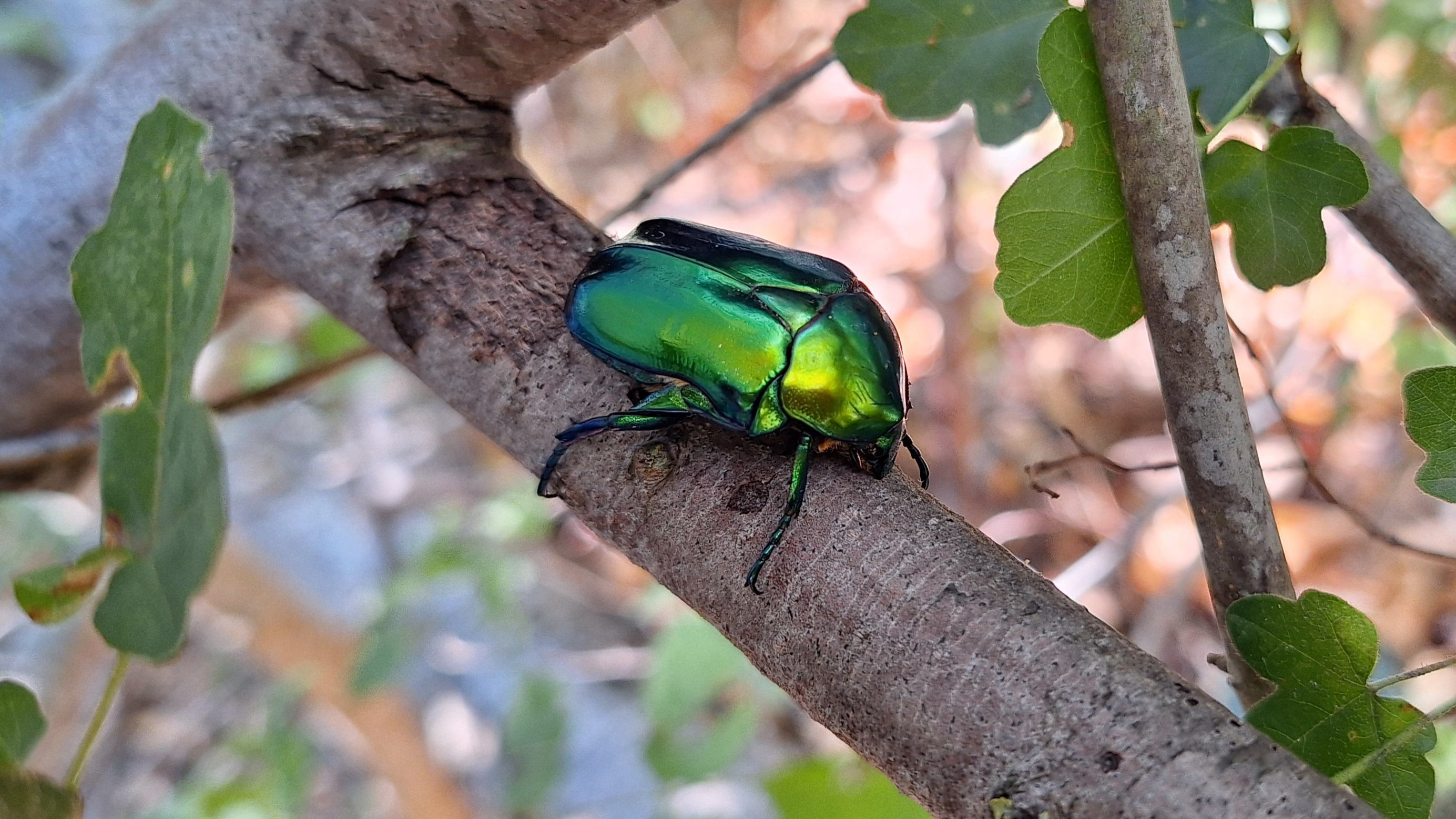
Protaetia cuprea in Bulgaria

The diversity of subspecies within P. cuprea highlights its evolutionary complexity and geographical spread. The subspecies Protaetia cuprea obscura is notably absent in Germany but is found across Central and Eastern Europe, including the Czech Republic, Slovakia, Austria (lowlands), Hungary, Italy (near Venezia), Bosnia and Herzegovina, Croatia, Romania, Bulgaria, and Greece. This subspecies is known to hybridize with P. cuprea metallica in Slovakia and Romania, indicating a rich interspecies interaction. The distribution of P. cuprea bourgini, as well as closely related P. cuprea brancoi, in Spain, separated by the natural barrier of the Pyrenees Mountains, showcases the influence of geographic features on species distribution.

The subspecies P. cuprea metallica is present in Northern Europe, with evidence from Norway, Sweden, northern England, and southern Scotland. In the southeast regions, spanning areas from Turkey to the Caucasus, new subspecies, including obscura, cuprina, ignicollis, caucasica, and hieroglyphica, are found, further enriching the distribution profile of this species.

== Habitat ==
The ecological adaptability of Protaetia cuprea is as remarkable as its geographical spread. This species thrives across various environments, from dense forests to the more open and arid steppe regions, indicating its broad ecological tolerance. Such adaptability extends to a wide altitude range, with P. cuprea populations established from sea-level shorelines to the more challenging conditions at elevations up to 2000 meters. This altitude range encompasses various environmental conditions, highlighting the species' capacity to adapt and thrive in varying climatic and geographical landscapes.

== Food resources ==
Research indicates that P. cuprea primarily feeds on decaying organic matter, such as fruits, flowers, and plant debris. Studies investigating the feeding habits of larvae revealed that they predominantly consume rotting wood and plant material. Additionally, adult beetles are known to feed on ripe fruits and sap exudates from damaged trees.

Furthermore, P. cuprea has been observed to exhibit opportunistic feeding behavior, consuming a wide range of organic materials depending on its availability in their habitat. This adaptability in food preference suggests a generalist feeding strategy, which may contribute to its ecological success in diverse habitats.

== Parental care ==
Parental care primarily concerns the provisioning and protection of offspring during the larval stage. Female P. cuprea lay their eggs in decaying organic substances, such as compost, dung, or decaying wood which is an ideal environment that influences survival and development of larvae. Upon hatching, female beetles demonstrate maternal care by actively tending to the larvae, ensuring they have access to suitable food resources and protection from predators, parasites, and environmental stressors.

== Life history ==
=== Life cycle ===
The life cycle of Protaetia cuprea is typically one year. However, under certain conditions, this beetle can develop more rapidly, growing into adults within the same year the eggs were laid by the parental generation.

In their larval stage, P. cuprea is primarily sapro-xylophagous. They have a particular affinity for deciduous trees, with oaks (Quercus spp.) being a favored habitat. Despite this preference, the larvae can also transition to pure saprophagy, evidenced by reports of larvae developing in compost heaps or forming associations with ant colonies.

== Morphology ==
The Protaetia cuprea species complex exhibits high morphological variability. The chromosome number across the genus Protaetia, including P. cuprea, is consistently 2n = 20. Despite this genetic stability, minor variances in X-chromosome morphology have been observed among some subspecies.

in Slovakia

The extensive morphological variability does not align with the phylogenetic insights from mitochondrial DNA studies. Morphological features traditionally used for taxonomical classification, such as coloration, body structure, and reproductive organ shapes, show significant variation that does not neatly correlate with genetic relationships. Traits like the elytra's distal sculpture and white "knee" markings emerged as clade-specific, yet their taxonomic significance remains ambiguous. Geometric morphometry has highlighted that variations in certain morphological traits are more gradual than discrete across the complex, further complicating the relationship between morphology and genetic data.

The observed high color variation within the species complex also does not mirror mitochondrial DNA (mtDNA) structures. This suggests that color polymorphism might be influenced by factors beyond genetics, such as environmental conditions and biotic interactions, including mimicry and aposematism. This implies a multifaceted regulation of morphological diversity in the P. cuprea complex, with genetic, environmental, and possibly other biotic factors contributing to the species' phenotypic plasticity.

=== Wings ===
The wings of Protaetia cuprea are structurally intricate to adapt to the flight mechanisms. The average wing length for this species is reported to be approximately 2.08 cm. No significant sexual dimorphism regarding wing deflection under similar forces is identified.

Like most insects, the wings are characterized by their thin, membranous structure, supported by thicker and stiffer veins. These veins are mainly concentrated towards the wing's leading edge and base, enhancing the flexural stiffness in these areas. This structural design fosters gradients in both lengthwise and chord-wise flexural stiffness, critical for achieving the wing twist and camber essential for flight, facilitating the complex aerodynamic performance of the wings.

The stiffness of the wings scales with size, with larger wings tending to be stiffer. Quantitatively, the wing span scaling with the cubic power for span-wise deflections and the square power of the wing chord for chord-wise deflections. On the other hand, aerodynamic force increases with wing size due to wing loading, impacting flight dynamics.

Moreover, Protaetia cuprea's wings are also characterized by resilin within the connections between some veins. Resilin is a rubber-like protein that contributes to the wings' elastic deformation capabilities during flight, enhancing their aerodynamic efficiency and adaptability to various flight conditions.

==== Elasticity ====
Despite lacking intrinsic musculature for active shape control during flight, insect wings undergo significant elastic deformations that play a crucial role in flight dynamics. The deformation of insect wings, specifically the twisting and cambering during the flapping cycle, is primarily facilitated by their mechanical properties and elastic structure rather than direct muscle action. This elasticity allows for wing twist in both directions, enabling lift generation during both upstrokes and downstrokes of flight. Furthermore, these adaptations help manage the angle of attack across the wing span, improve flow attachment, increase lift, and delay flow separation during dynamic movements, which is essential for aerodynamic efficiency. During low-speed flight, wings experience pronounced chord-wise elastic deformations, especially near the proximal trailing edge, contributing to significant twists and enhanced camber.

== Genetics ==
The phylogenetic complexity of the Protaetia cuprea species group is underscored by its high degree of polymorphism and extensive distribution range. Recent research conducted utilized two mitochondrial DNA markers (COI and CytB) alongside morphological, coloration, and geographical distribution analyses to assess population divergence within this species complex. This multifaceted approach aimed to clarify the taxonomic status of several clades within the P. cuprea complex, including the P. cuprea metallica and the Sicilian P. hypocrita. Despite various approaches by different groups to investigate the P. cuprea complex, the taxonomic resolution of these clades remains ambiguous, with contradictory findings across studies.

=== Subspecies ===
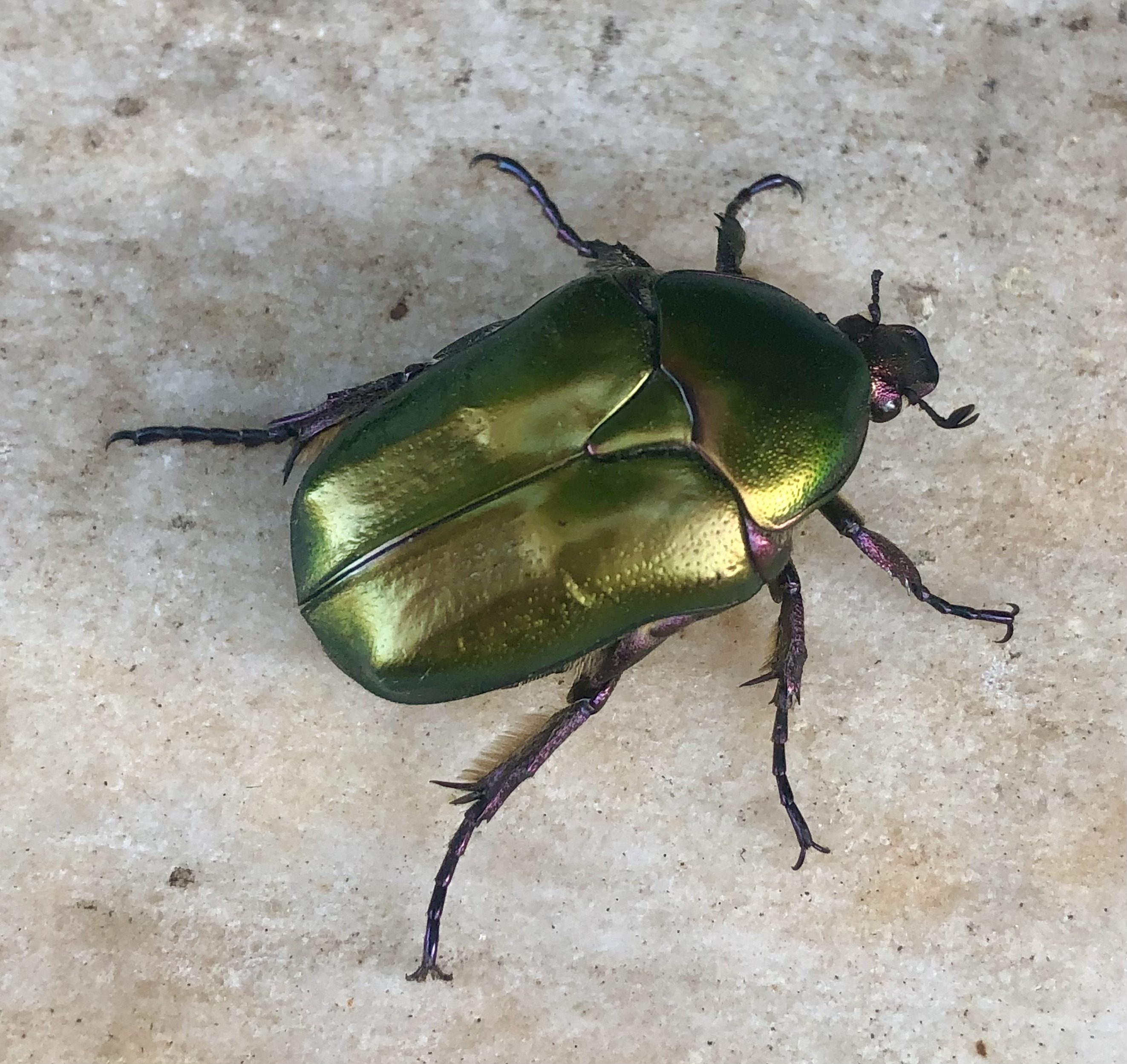
Protaetia cuprea subsp. obscura in Athens

Protaetia cuprea contains the following subspecies:

- Protaetia cuprea subsp. adelheid Mitter, 2017
- Protaetia cuprea subsp. alainilerestifi (Montreuil & Legrand, 2010)
- Protaetia cuprea subsp. algerica Motschulsky, 1849
- Protaetia cuprea subsp. bourgini Ruter, 1967
- Protaetia cuprea subsp. brancoi Baraud, 1992
- Protaetia cuprea subsp. cuprea
- Protaetia cuprea subsp. daurica (Motschulsky, 1860)
- Protaetia cuprea subsp. ferreriesensis (Compte-Sart & Carreras-Torrent, 2013)
- Protaetia cuprea subsp. hesperica (Motschulsky, 1849)
- Protaetia cuprea subsp. hypocrita (Ragusa, 1905)
- Protaetia cuprea subsp. ignicollis (Gory & Percheron, 1833)
- Protaetia cuprea subsp. ikonomovi (Miksic, 1958)
- Protaetia cuprea subsp. levantina (Schatzmayr, 1936)
- Protaetia cuprea subsp. mehrabii (Montreuil & Legrand, 2008)
- Protaetia cuprea subsp. metallica (Herbst, 1782)
- Protaetia cuprea subsp. obscura (Andersch, 1797)
- Protaetia cuprea subsp. olivacea (Mulsant, 1842)
- Protaetia cuprea subsp. viridiaurata (Fuente, 1897)
- Protaetia cuprea subsp. volhyniensis (Gory & Percheron, 1833)

== Physiology ==
=== Flight ===
The Protaetia cuprea, both pollinator and agricultural pest, exhibits a remarkable flight mechanism that supports its day-to-day foraging activities. These beetles are adept at accurate maneuvering and precise landings on flowers and fruits, which is essential for their feeding habits.

==== Effect of body size ====
Within the species, Protaetia cuprea, a significant intraspecific variation in adult body mass was observed, with individuals displaying more than a threefold difference in mass, ranging from 0.38 to 1.29 grams. This considerable variance in body mass necessitates adaptations in the structural properties of the wings to adequately support the beetle's weight during flight.

In Protaetia cuprea, larger beetles show a decreased flapping frequency, yet the fundamental kinematics of wing flapping are consistent across all sizes. The Meresman and Ribak (2017) study observed that wing deflection varies, greater at the proximal edge than at the distal edge during both downstroke and upstroke. This pattern, scaling with the wing chord to the power of 1.0, indicates a consistent wing twist and camber regardless of body or wing size, suggesting adjustments in wing stiffness to maintain these aerodynamic features. Despite initial hypotheses predicting a more significant increase in wing camber with beetle size, actual deflections scaled less steeply with body mass. It is found that the wing increases rigidity in larger beetles. This rigidity ensures a constant wing camber across varying body masses, with the wing aspect ratio remaining the same, indicating isometric growth in the wing area. This adaptation allows P. cuprea to maintain efficient flight dynamics across individuals of different sizes.

==== Maneuvering dynamics ====
In analyzing the flight dynamics of these beetles, observations reveal a mean flight speed of approximately 0.41 m/s with a mean wingbeat frequency of 110 Hz. Notably, the wingtip velocity during flapping reached an average of 9.13 m/s, significantly surpassing the beetles' three-dimensional flight speed. Additionally, the vertical component of their flight speed was relatively low, averaging only 0.1 m/s. Regarding maneuverability, the beetles demonstrated an ability to rotate around their axis by an average of 39 degrees at a turn rate of approximately 1429 degrees per second.

==== Metabolic cost ====
One study found that P. cuprea converts chemical (metabolic) energy to mechanical flight energy with a mean efficiency of 10.4%. Larger beetles have higher energy conversion efficiency. Seasonal dietary shifts, from pollen in early summer to fruits later on, impact their energy budget for foraging. An interesting observation was that starved beetles increased their body mass by 6% after feeding on apples for two hours, providing enough energy for a 630-meter flight, assuming a carbohydrate assimilation efficiency of 90%. Low in water and carbohydrates but high in proteins and lipids, pollen offers a higher caloric content and different assimilation processes for converting food to flight energy. The energy-intensive foraging behavior of P. cuprea is compensated by prolonged feeding after a short flight, ensuring energy efficiency for aerial locomotion.

== Interactions with humans and livestock ==
=== Agricultural use ===
The study by Babarabie et al. (2018) highlights the possible agricultural benefits of utilizing P. cuprea larvae in composting organic materials, including kitchen waste and various types of leaves. Specifically, it examines how compost produced by P. cuprea larvae compares with traditional vermicompost in terms of nutrient content and physical properties. The findings reveal that compost derived from kitchen waste processed by these larvae contained higher levels of essential nutrients such as nitrogen, potassium, and phosphorus. Compost from lawn clippings also showed improved pH levels and uniformity, which is crucial for agricultural use. This indicates the potential of P. cuprea larvae to improve compost quality and usability, thereby supporting more sustainable agricultural practices.

=== Pest ===
Adult P. cuprea has a detrimental impact on fruit trees and ornamental plants by feeding on reproductive parts and ripening fruits. The application of insecticides is restricted during phases such as flowering and just before harvest to protect beneficial insects like honeybees and to avoid health hazards. As an alternative, mass trapping, contingent upon an efficient trapping system, is proposed as an effective pest management strategy. The development of selective floral attractant-baited traps aimed at P. cuprea is in progress, opening up a potential solution for their control.
