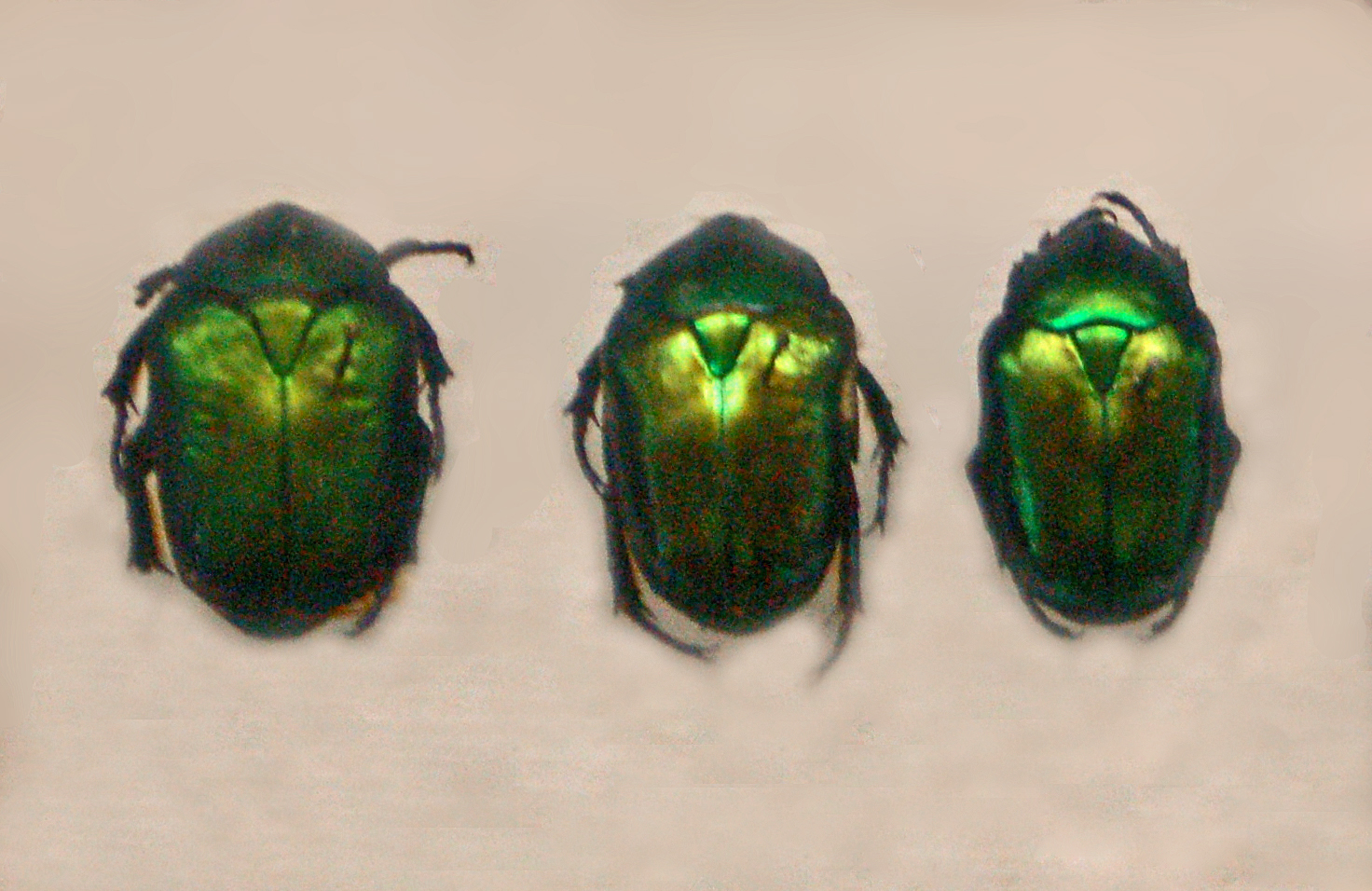

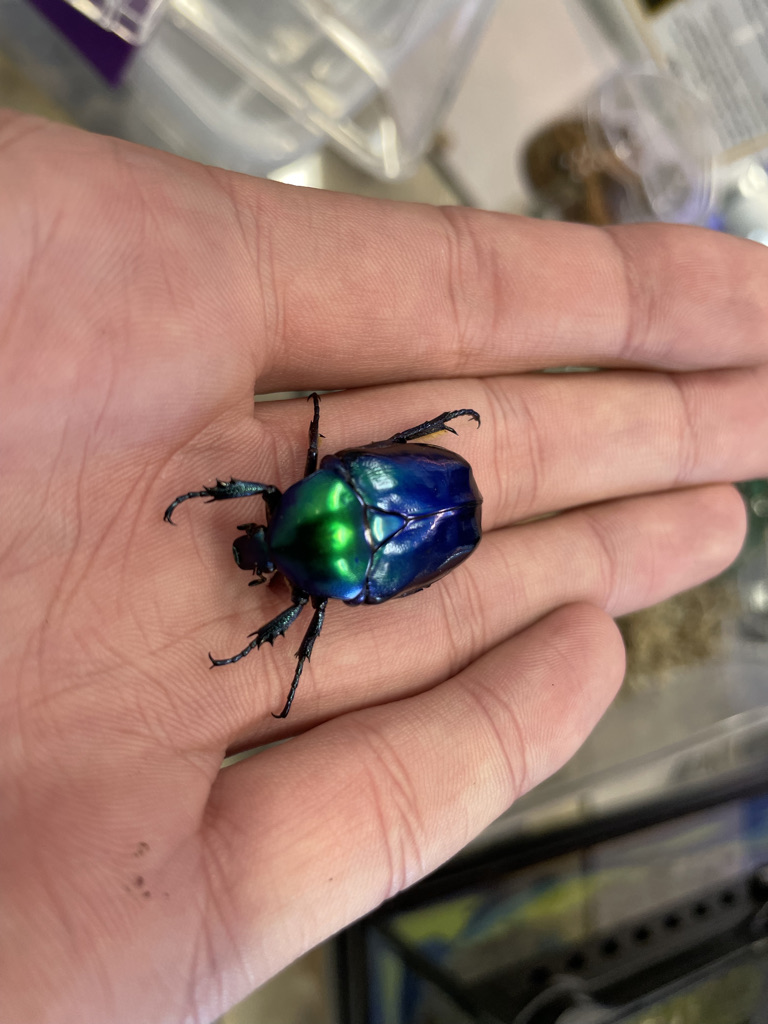
- P.s. jousselini at Prague's National Museum (top), P.s. cyanochlora at Entomica Insectarium (bottom)

Scientific classification
- Kingdom: Animalia
- Phylum: Arthropoda
- Clade: Pancrustacea
- Class: Insecta
- Order: Coleoptera
- Suborder: Polyphaga
- Infraorder: Scarabaeiformia
- Family: Scarabaeidae
- Genus: Protaetia
- Species: P. speciosa

Binomial name
- Protaetia speciosa (Adams, 1817)

Synonyms
- Cetonischema speciosa (Adams, 1817)

= Protaetia speciosa =

Species of beetle

Protaetia speciosa is a beetle of the family Scarabaeidae and subfamily Cetoniinae.

== Description ==
Protaetia speciosa can reach a body length of about 23–30 mm (0.9–1.2 in). The basic colour of the body typically is metallic golden-green, but depending on subspecies sometimes red or blue. Adults can be found from May to October, with a peak in June–August. These beetles feed primarily on tree sap and fruits. The larvae develop in rotten wood of deciduous trees, mainly oak and willow.

== Distribution ==
This flower beetle is present in the Near East and far southeastern Europe, in northern Iraq, Syria, northern Iran, Georgia, Armenia, Azerbaijan, Turkmenistan, Ukraine, southernmost Russia and Romania.

== Habitat ==
This beetle lives in deciduous forests, in plains and mountains.

== Subspecies ==
- Protaetia speciosa cyanochlora (Schauer, 1941)
- Protaetia speciosa jousselini (Gory & Percheron, 1833)
- Protaetia speciosa speciosa (Adams, 1817)
- Protaetia speciosa venusta (Ménétriès, 1836)
