= Catalabus =

Scientific classification
- Domain: Eukaryota
- Kingdom: Animalia
- Phylum: Arthropoda
- Class: Insecta
- Order: Coleoptera
- Suborder: Polyphaga
- Infraorder: Cucujiformia
- Family: Attelabidae
- Tribe: Paramecolabini
- Genus: Catalabus; Voss, 1925

Genus of beetles

Catalabus is a genus of leaf rolling weevils in the beetle family Attelabidae. There are about nine described species in Catalabus.

== Species ==
These nine species belong to the genus Catalabus:

- Catalabus elegans (Voss, 1933)
- Catalabus kazantsevi (Legalov, 2003)
- Catalabus marieae (Kresl, 2007)
- Catalabus nigrosuturalis (Voss, 1930)
- Catalabus pallidipennis (Voss, 1925)
- Catalabus quadriplagiatus (Voss, 1953)
- Catalabus rasuwanus Legalov, 2007
- Catalabus simulatus (G.A.K. Marshall, 1923)
