= Poiretia elegans =

Scientific classification
- Kingdom: Plantae
- Clade: Tracheophytes
- Clade: Angiosperms
- Clade: Eudicots
- Clade: Rosids
- Order: Fabales
- Family: Fabaceae
- Subfamily: Faboideae
- Genus: Poiretia
- Species: P. elegans

Binomial name
- Poiretia elegans Cl.Müll. 1986

Species of legume

Poiretia elegans is a species of flowering plants in the family Fabaceae. It is found in Brazil (Minas Gerais).
