= Jean Louis Marie Poiret =

French clergyman, botanist, and explorer (1755-1834)

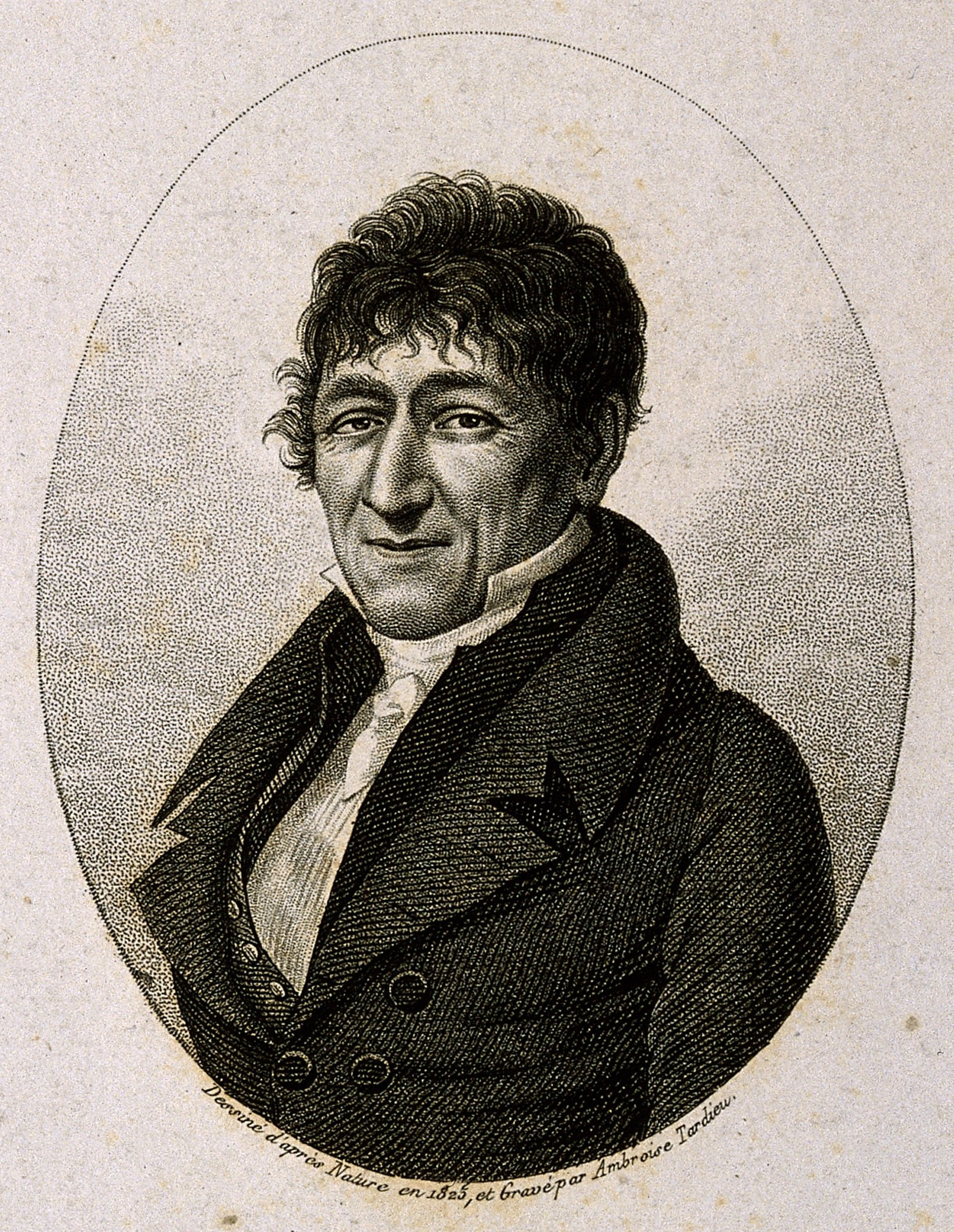
Portrait ofJean Louis Marie Poiret

Jean Louis Marie Poiret (11 June 1755 in Saint-Quentin – 7 April 1834 in Paris) was a French clergyman, botanist, and explorer.

From 1785 to 1786, he was sent by Louis XVI to Algeria to study the flora. After the French Revolution, he became a professor of natural history at the Écoles Centrale of Aisne.

The genus Poiretia of the legume family Fabaceae was named after him in 1807 by Étienne Pierre Ventenat. The standard author abbreviation Poir. is used to indicate this person as the author when citing a botanical name.

== Selected publications ==
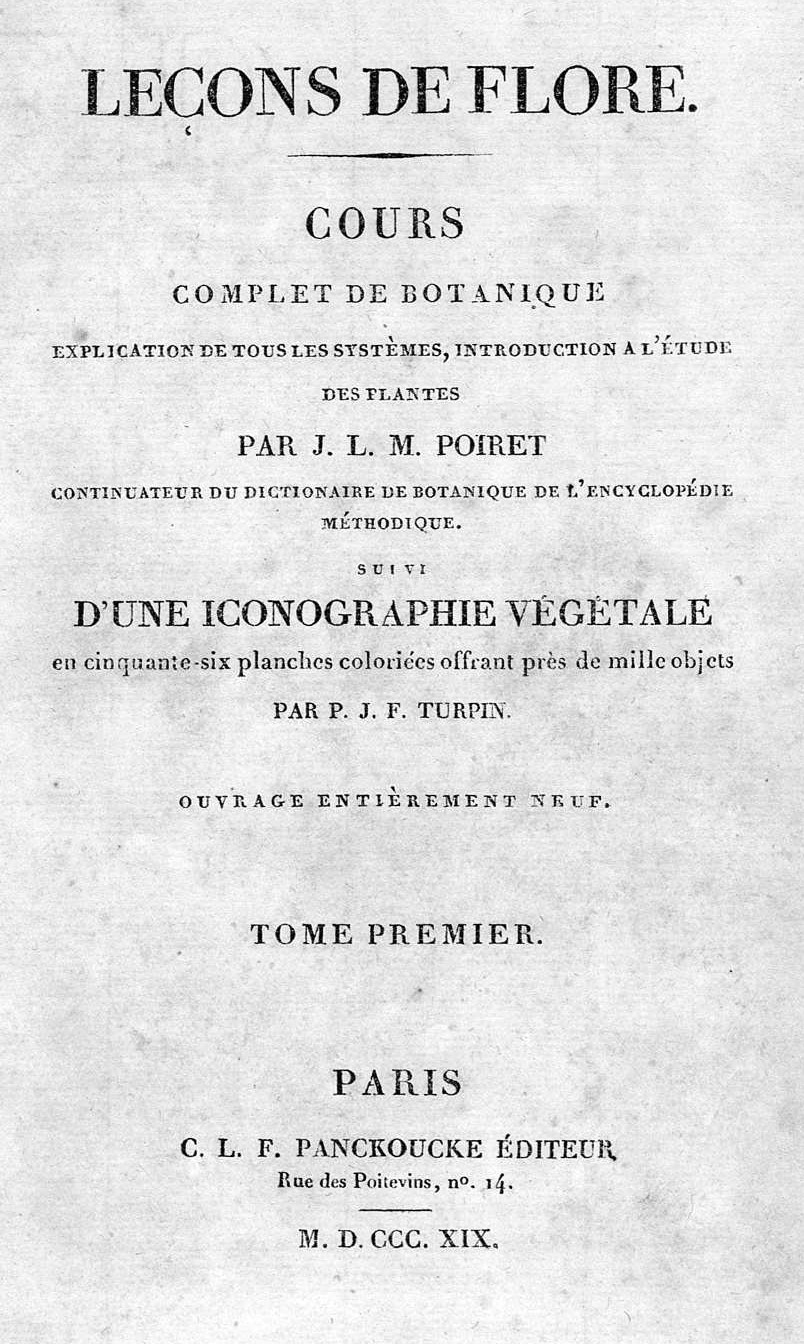
Leçons de flore, 1819

- Coquilles fluviatiles et terrestres observées dans le département de l'Aisne et aux environs de Paris. Prodrome. – pp. i–xi [1–11], 1–119. Paris. (Barrois, Soissons); (1801).
- Leçons de flore: Cours complet de botanique (1819–1820); (illus. by P. J. F. Turpin).
- Leçons de flore (in French). Vol. 1. Paris: Charles Louis Fleury Panckoucke. 1819.
- Leçons de flore (in French). Vol. 2. Paris: Charles Louis Fleury Panckoucke. 1820.
- Flore médicale (in French). Vol. 7. Paris: Charles Louis Fleury Panckoucke. 1820.
- Flore médicale (in French). Vol. 8. Paris: Charles Louis Fleury Panckoucke. 1820.
- Voyage en Barbarie, …, pendant les années 1785 et 1786 (1789).
- Histoire philosophique, littéraire, économique des plantes d'Europe; (1825–1829).
- with Jean-Baptiste de Lamarck Encyclopédie méthodique: Botanique; (1789–1817).
- with Jean-Baptiste de Lamarck Tableau encyclopédique et méthodique des trois règnes de la nature: Botanique; (1819–1823).

== Tribute ==
"Poiretia, la revue naturaliste du Maghreb" is a free online natural history journal created in 2008. It discusses (in French) the flora and fauna inventory, description, and mapping in north-western Africa (Maghreb). Its name is dedicated to Jean Louis Marie Poiret, as a tribute to his famous Voyage en Barbarie published in 1789.
