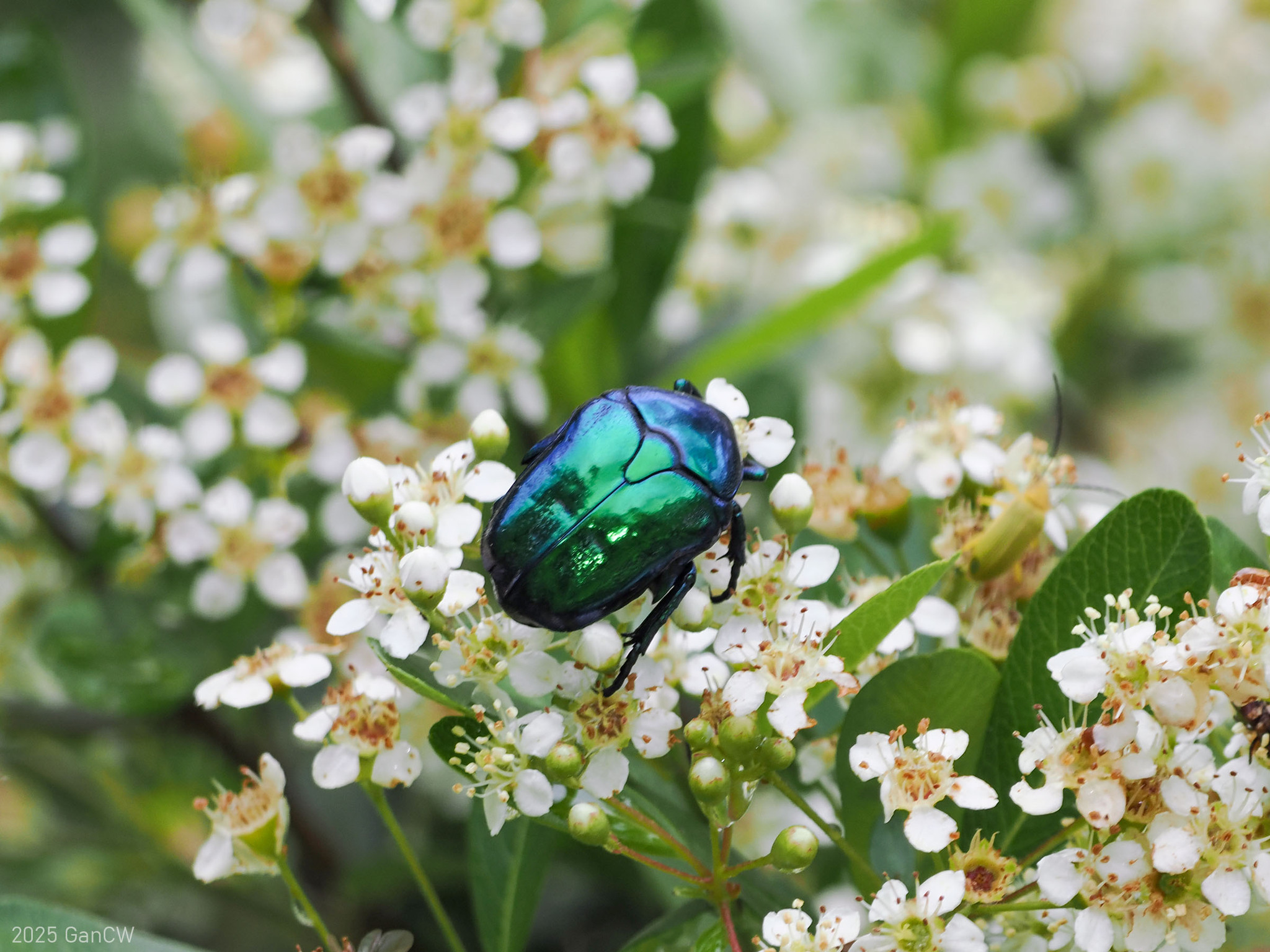

Scientific classification
- Kingdom: Animalia
- Phylum: Arthropoda
- Clade: Pancrustacea
- Class: Insecta
- Order: Coleoptera
- Suborder: Polyphaga
- Infraorder: Scarabaeiformia
- Family: Scarabaeidae
- Genus: Protaetia
- Species: P. elegans

Binomial name
- Protaetia elegans (Kometami, 1938)

Synonyms
- Calopotosia elegans Kometami, 1938; Protaetia (Calopotosia) elegans Kometami, 1938

= Protaetia elegans =

Species of beetle

Protaetia elegans is a species of flower chafers, scarab beetles in the subfamily Cetoniinae. It is found in Taiwan.
