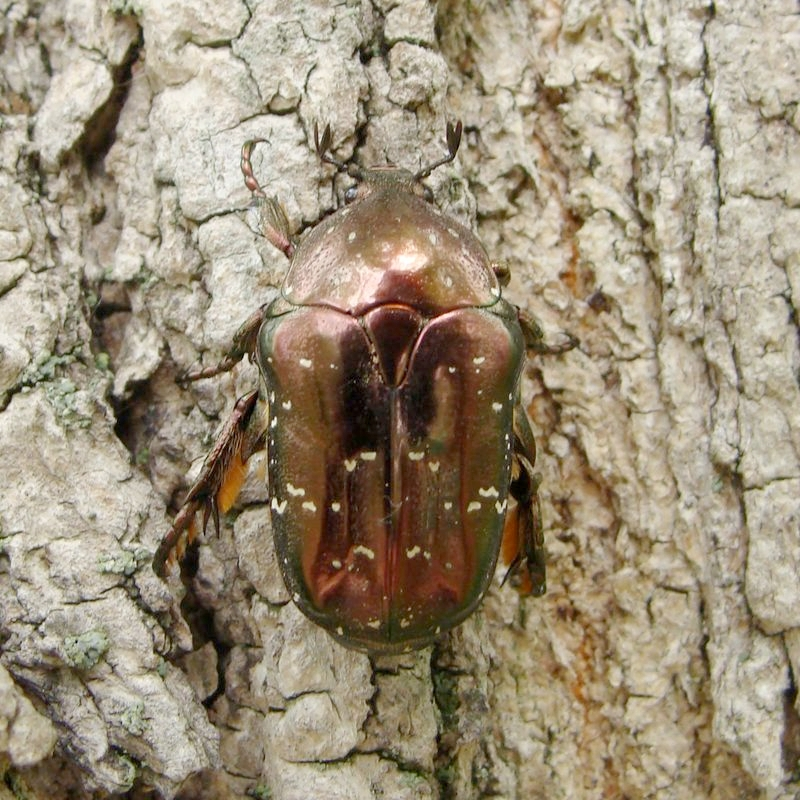
- Protaetia orientalis

Scientific classification
- Kingdom: Animalia
- Phylum: Arthropoda
- Class: Insecta
- Order: Coleoptera
- Suborder: Polyphaga
- Infraorder: Scarabaeiformia
- Family: Scarabaeidae
- Subtribe: Cetoniina
- Genus: Protaetia; Burmeister, 1842

Subgenera
- Protaetia (Acanthoprotaetia) Mikšič, 1987; Protaetia (Autoprotaetia) Mikšič, 1965; Protaetia (Calopotosia) Reitter, 1898; Protaetia (Caloprotaetia) Mikšič, 1963; Protaetia (Cetonischema) Reitter, 1898; Protaetia (Chalcoprotaetia) Mikšič, 1963; Protaetia (Chrysopotosia) Mikšič, 1966; Protaetia (Dicranobia) Miksic, 1963; Protaetia (Eupotosia) Mikšič, 1954; Protaetia (Euprotaetia) Mikšič, 1963; Protaetia (Finkia) Mikšič, 1965; Protaetia (Foveopotosia) Mikšič, 1959; Protaetia (Goetzia) Mikšič, 1963; Protaetia (Heteroprotaetia) Mikšič, 1963; Protaetia (Kuytenia) Mikšič, 1963; Protaetia (Liocola) C.G. Thomson, 1859; Protaetia (Netocia) Costa, 1852; Protaetia (Poecilophana) Kraatz, 1895; Protaetia (Potosia) Mulsant & Rey, 1871; Protaetia (Potosiomima) Mikšič, 1968; Protaetia (Protaetia) Burmeister, 1842; Protaetia (Pyropotosia) Reitter, 1898; Protaetia (Tomentoprotaetia) Mikšič, 1987

= Protaetia =

Genus of beetles

Protaetia is a genus of beetles of the family Scarabaeidae, occurring primarily in Asia, and containing over 300 species.

== Selected species ==
- Protaetia acuminata (Fabricius, 1775)
- Protaetia affinis (Andersch, 1797)
- Protaetia afflicta (Gory & Percheron, 1833)
- Protaetia alboguttata (Vigors, 1826)
- Protaetia aurichalcea (Fabricius, 1775)
- Protaetia bipunctata (Gory & Percheron, 1833)
- Protaetia brevitarsis (Lewis, 1879)
- Protaetia conspersa Janson, 1877
- Protaetia culta (Waterhouse, 1879)
- Protaetia cuprea (Fabricius, 1775)
- Protaetia elegans (Kometami, 1938)
- Protaetia fieberi (Kraatz, 1880)
- Protaetia fusca (Herbst, 1790)
- Protaetia haiastanica Ghrejyan & Kalashian, 2017
- Protaetia lewisi Janson, 1888
- Protaetia lugubris (Herbst, 1786)
- Protaetia mirifica (Mulsant, 1842)
- Protaetia opaca (Fabricius, 1787)
- Protaetia orientalis (Gory & Percheron, 1833)
- Protaetia pryeri Janson, 1888
- Protaetia regalis (Blanchard, 1842)
- Protaetia speciosa (Adams, 1817)
- Protaetia spectabilis (Schaum, 1841)
- Protaetia ungarica (Herbst, 1790)
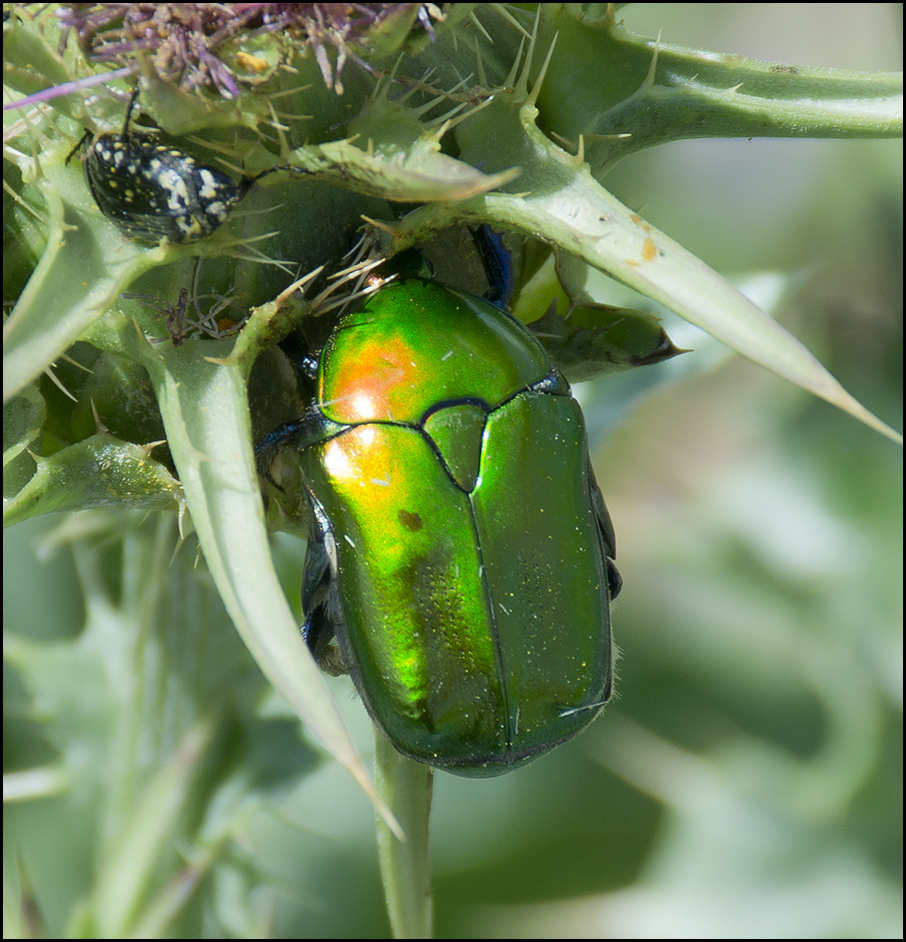
Protaetia cuprea ignicollis in Israel

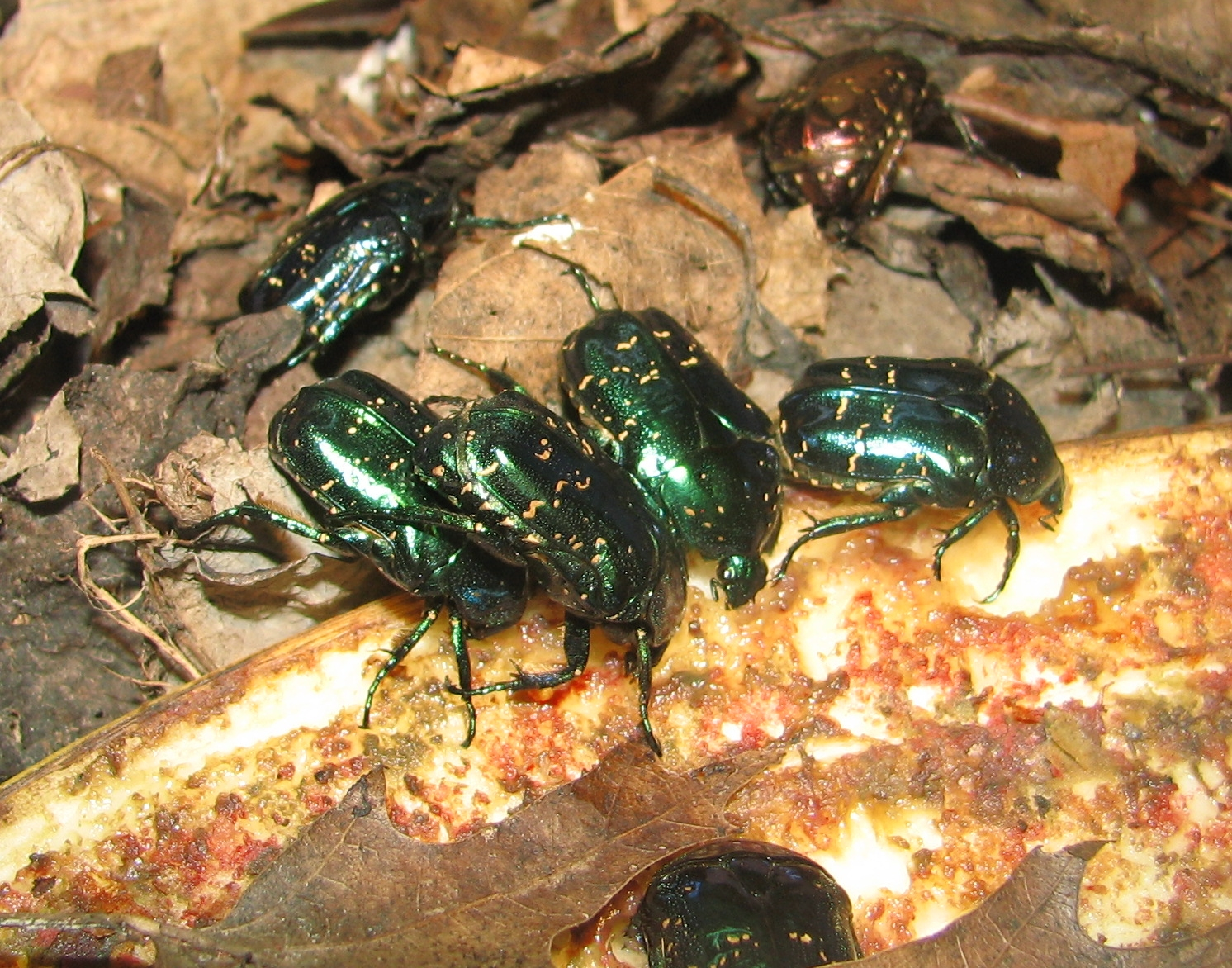
Protaetia lewisi

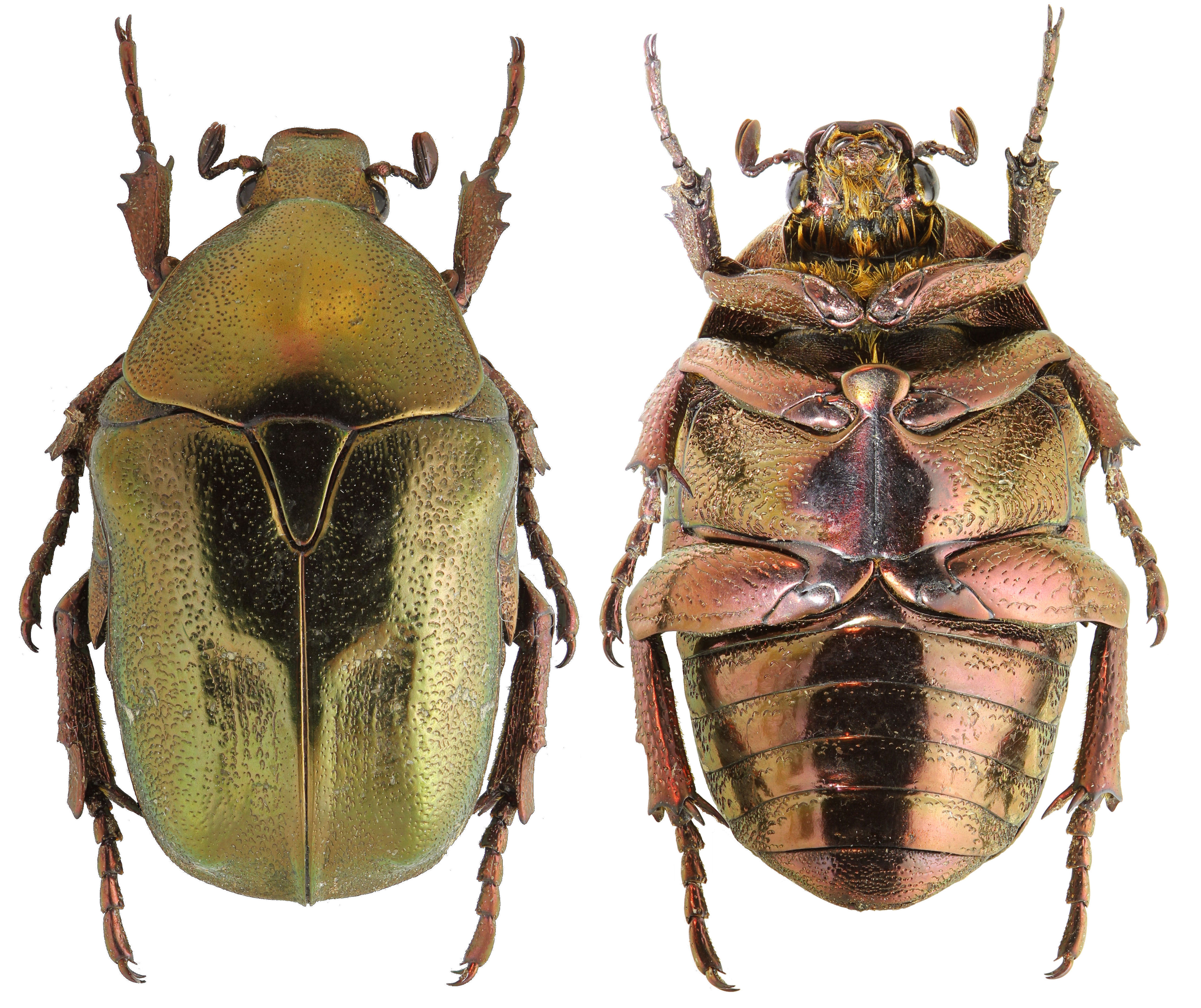
Protaetia fieberi

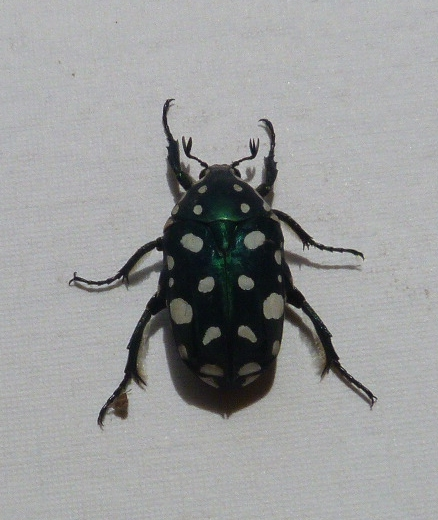
Protaetia alboguttata

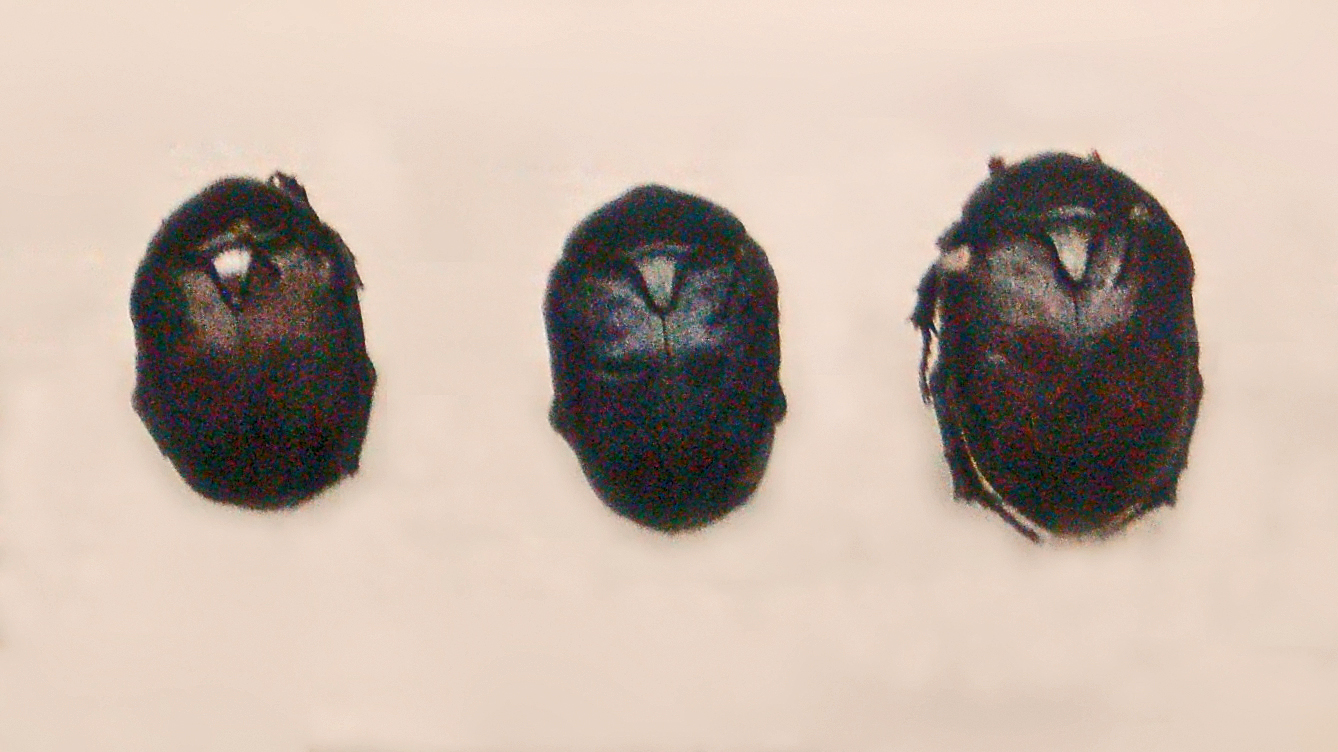
Protaetia afflicta at National Museum (Prague)

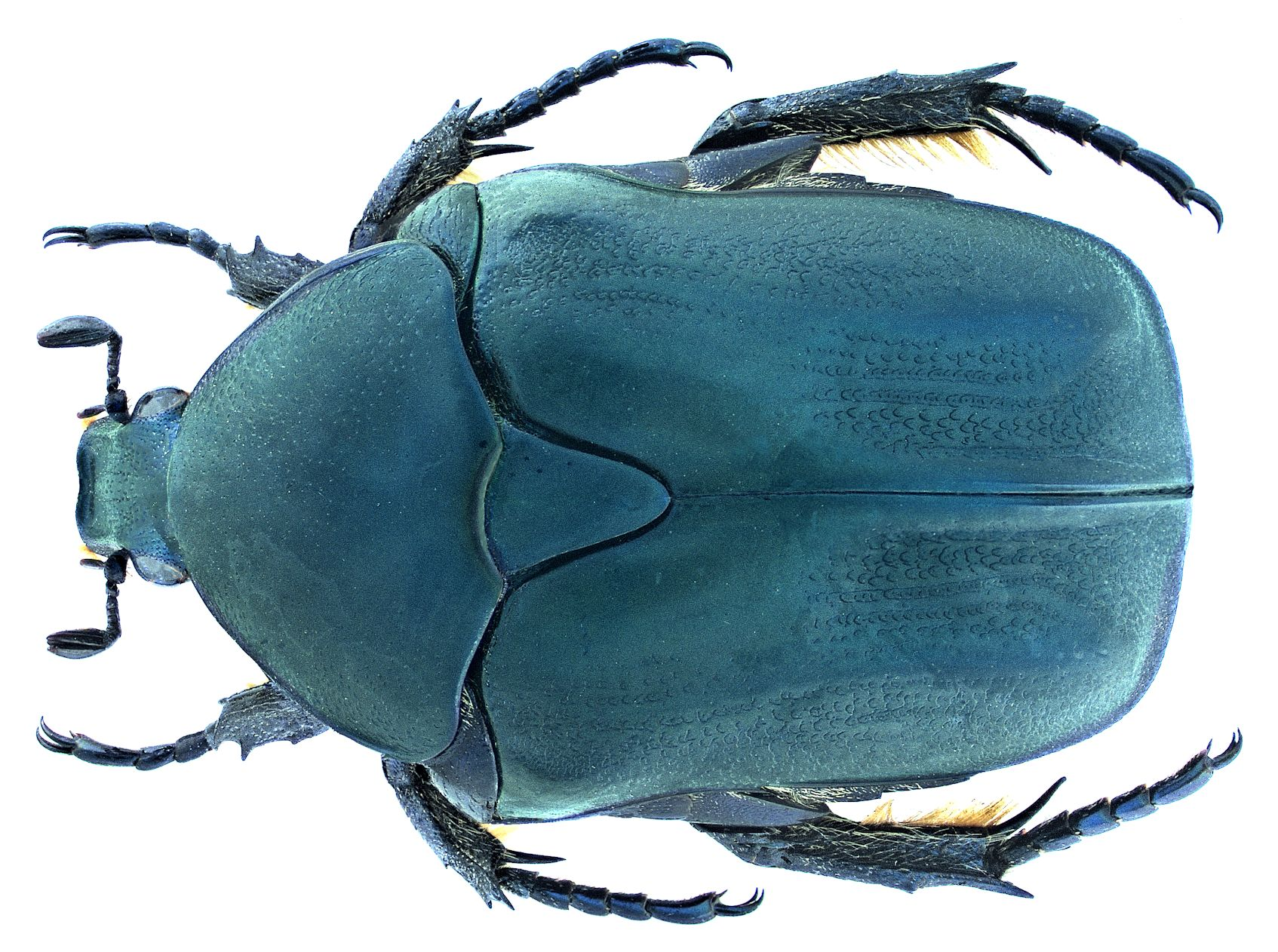
Protaetia opaca

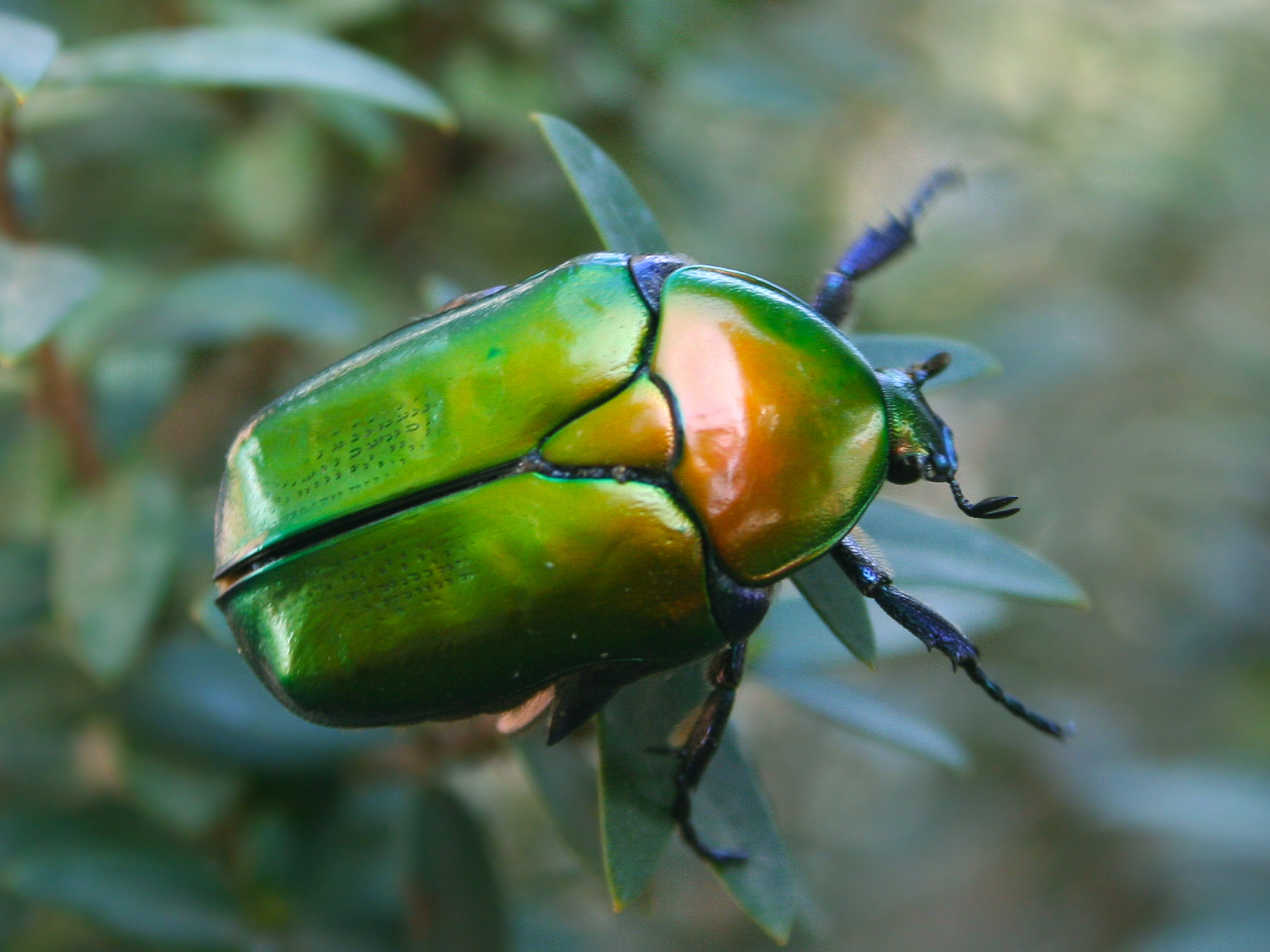
Protaetia cuprea in Israel

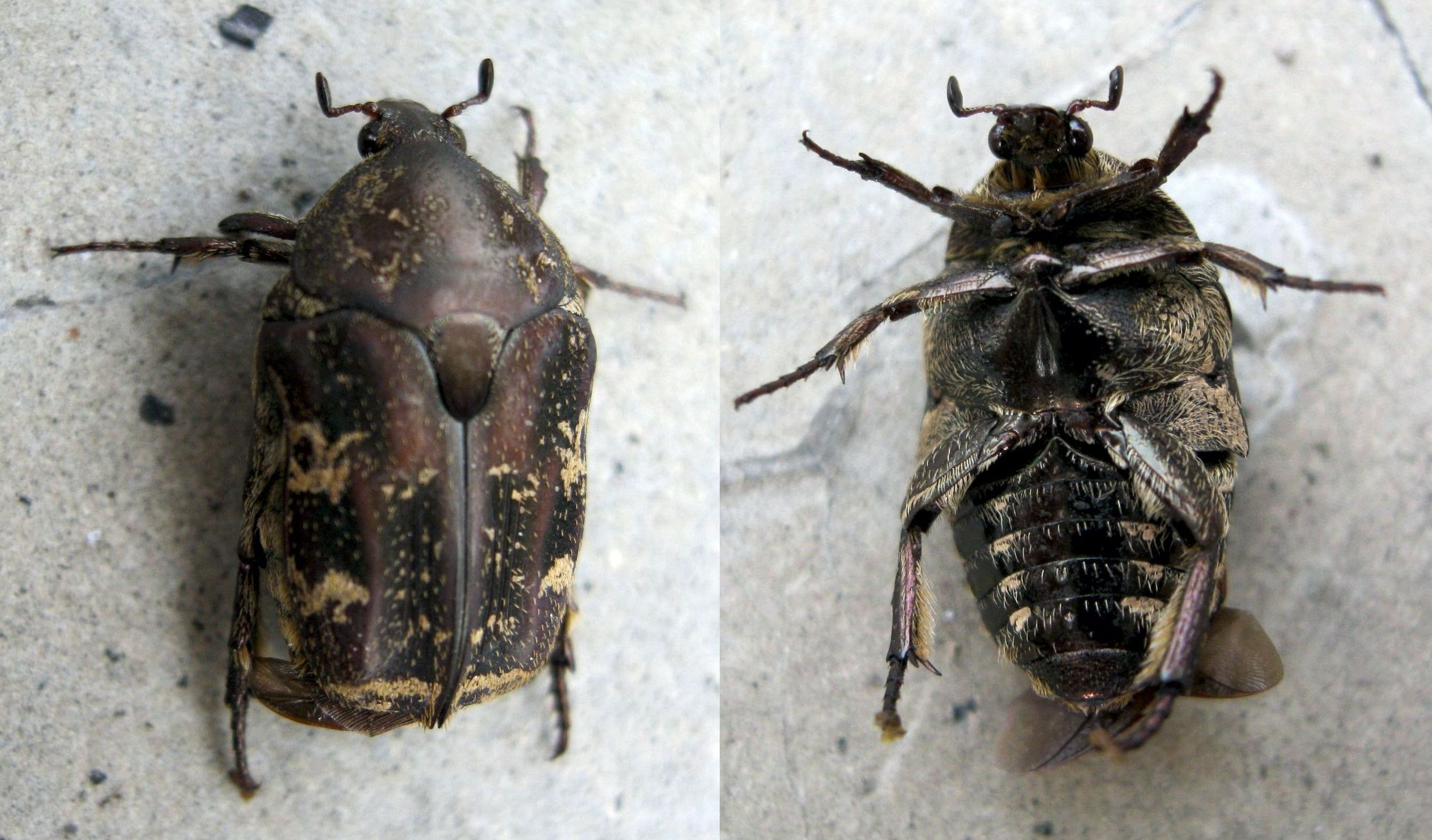
Protaetia fusca in Yogyakarta

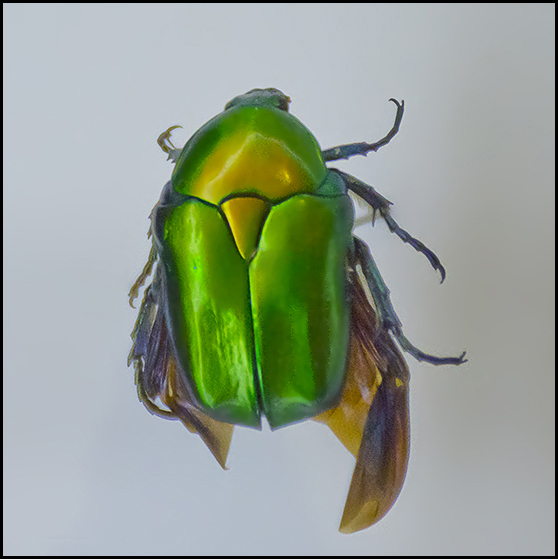
Protaetia cuprea ignicollis

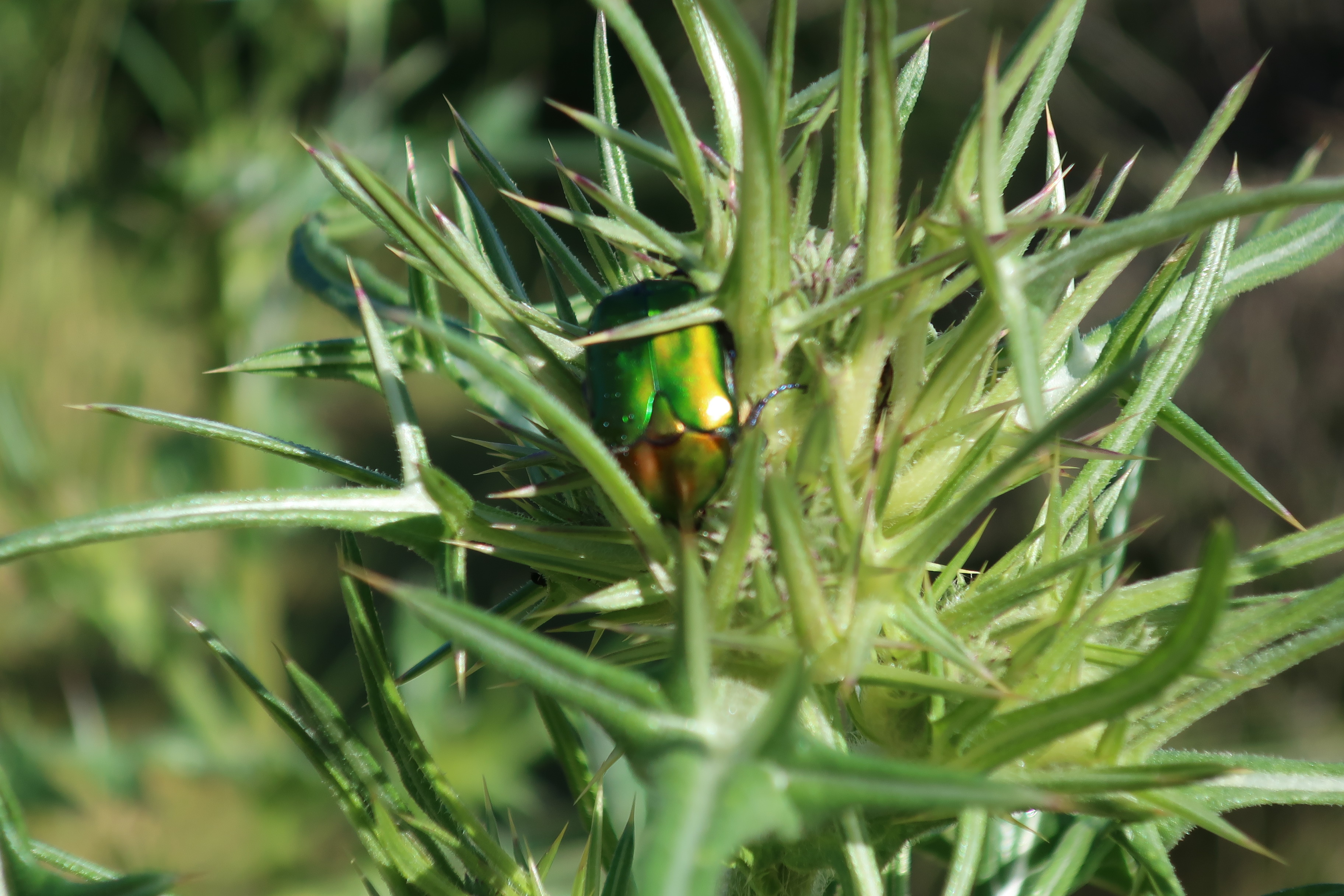
Protaetia cuprea ignicollis feeding on a thistle
