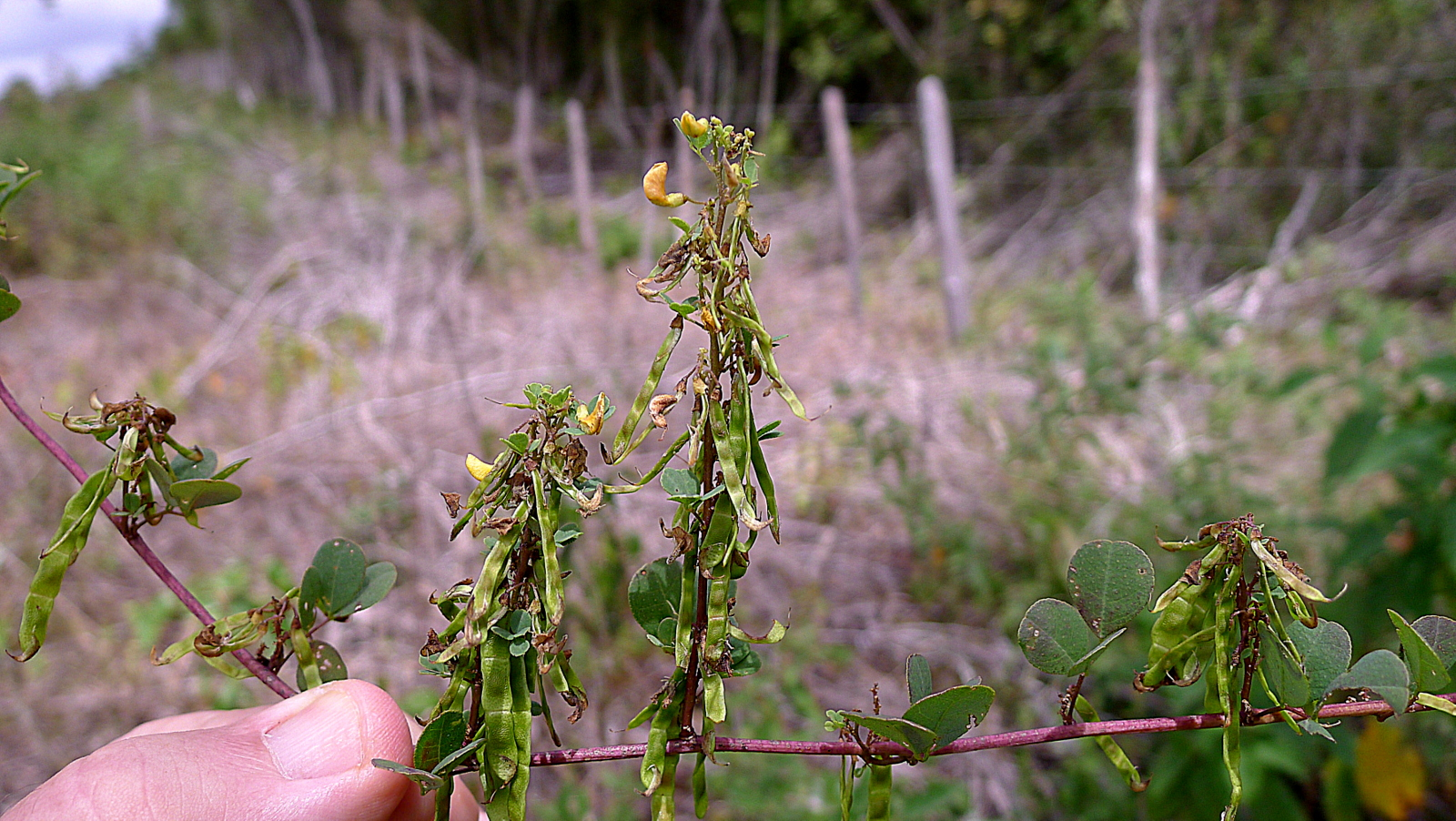
- Poiretia punctata

Scientific classification
- Kingdom: Plantae
- Clade: Tracheophytes
- Clade: Angiosperms
- Clade: Eudicots
- Clade: Rosids
- Order: Fabales
- Family: Fabaceae
- Subfamily: Faboideae
- Tribe: Dalbergieae
- Genus: Poiretia; Vent. (1807), nom. cons.

Species
- Poiretia angustifolia Vogel; Poiretia bahiana C. Mueller; Poiretia coriifolia Vogel; Poiretia crenata C. Mueller; Poiretia elegans C. Mueller; Poiretia latifolia Vogel; Poiretia longipes Harms; Poiretia marginata Cl.Müll.; Poiretia mattogrossensis C. Mueller; Poiretia punctata (Willd.) Desv.; Poiretia tetraphylla (Poir.) Burkart; Poiretia unifoliolata Barreto ex J.L.Martins & Pedersoli

Synonyms
- Turpinia Pers. (1807), nom. illeg.

= Poiretia (plant) =

Genus of legumes

Poiretia is a genus of flowering plants in the family Fabaceae. It includes 12 species of twining, scandent, or erect herbs and shrubs native to the tropical Americas, ranging from southern Mexico to northern Argentina, including Cuba and Hispaniola. Most species are native to eastern Brazil, Paraguay, and northern Argentina; Poiretia punctata ranges further north and west to northern South America, Central America, Mexico, and the Caribbean. Typical habitats include seasonally-dry tropical to subtropical riverine forest, woodland (cerrado), grassland, and shrubland.

The genus belongs to the subfamily Faboideae, and was recently assigned to the informal monophyletic Adesmia clade of the Dalbergieae.
