= Catalabus elegans =

Scientific classification
- Domain: Eukaryota
- Kingdom: Animalia
- Phylum: Arthropoda
- Class: Insecta
- Order: Coleoptera
- Suborder: Polyphaga
- Infraorder: Cucujiformia
- Family: Attelabidae
- Tribe: Paramecolabini
- Genus: Catalabus
- Species: C. elegans

Binomial name
- Catalabus elegans Legalov, 2007

Species of beetle

Catalabus elegans is a species of leaf rolling weevil in the beetle family Attelabidae found in Indomalaya.
