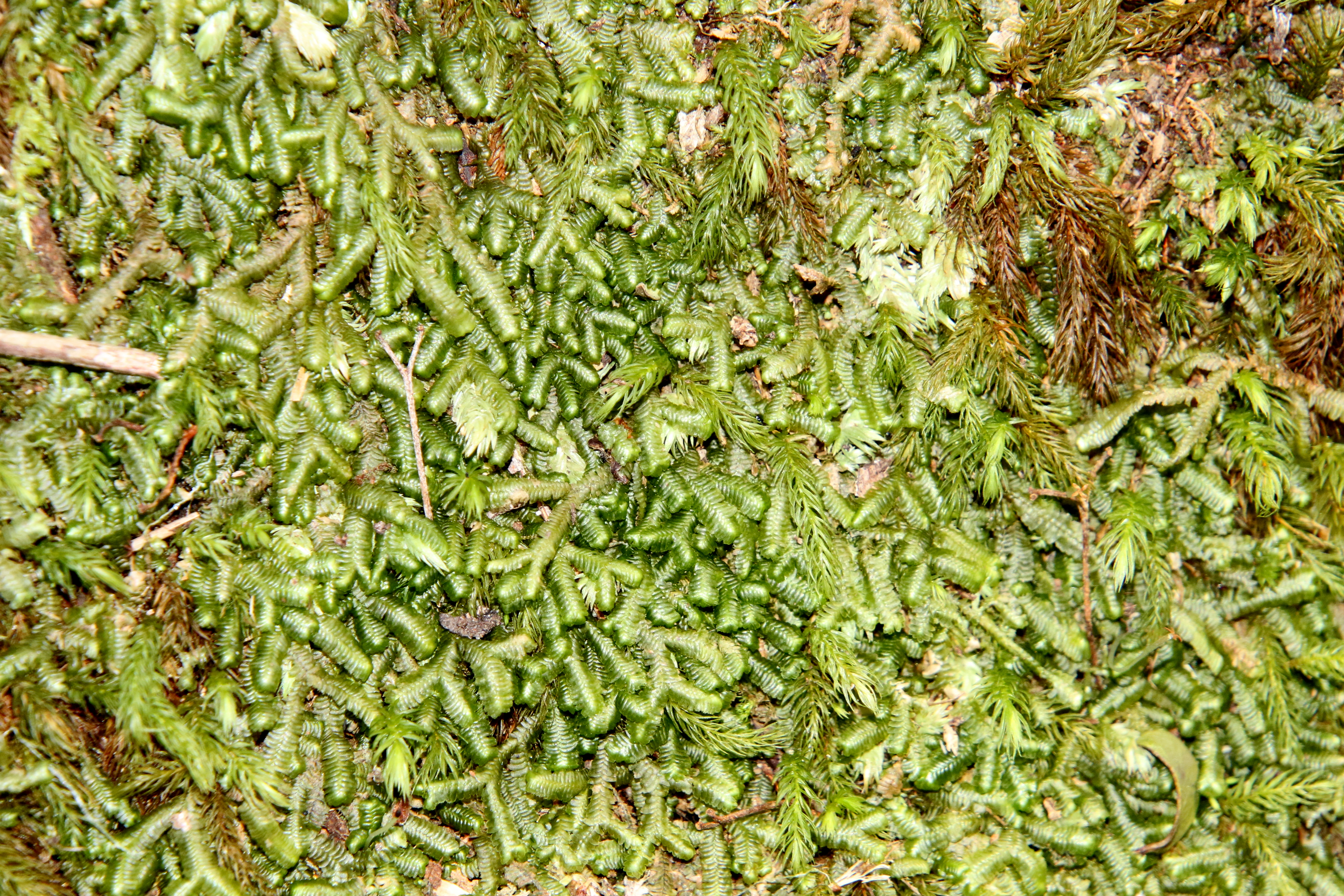
- Watagans National Park, Australia

Scientific classification
- Kingdom: Plantae
- Division: Marchantiophyta
- Class: Jungermanniopsida
- Order: Lepidoziales
- Family: Lepidoziaceae
- Genus: Bazzania
- Species: B. adnexa

Binomial name
- Bazzania adnexa (Lehm. & Lindenb.) Trevis.

Synonyms
- Jungermannia adnexa Lehm. & Lindenb.

= Bazzania adnexa =

Species of liverwort

Bazzania adnexa is a species of liverwort in the Lepidoziaceae family. A large liverwort, appearing in bright green mats or loose cushions, found in moist forests. Plants are characteristically branched in a Y-shape. Commonly found in suitable habitats in Australia and New Zealand.
