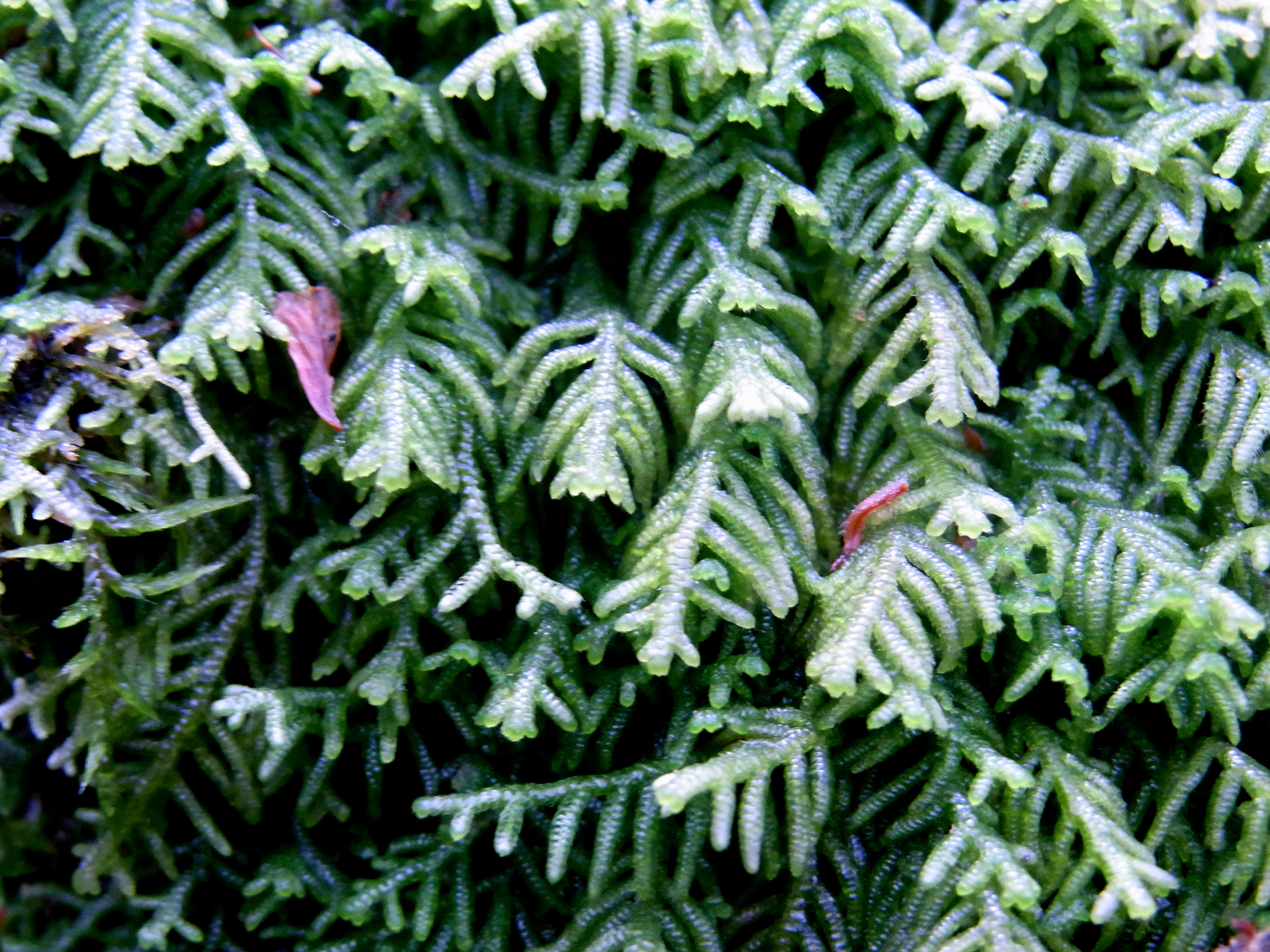

Scientific classification
- Kingdom: Plantae
- Division: Marchantiophyta
- Class: Jungermanniopsida
- Order: Lepidoziales
- Family: Lepidoziaceae
- Genus: Lepidozia
- Species: L. ulothrix

Binomial name
- Lepidozia ulothrix (Schwägr.) Lindenb. 1845

Synonyms
- Jungermannia albula Hook.f. & Taylor

= Lepidozia ulothrix =

Species of liverwort

Lepidozia ulothrix is a species of liverwort in the family Lepidoziaceae. It is found in the moist habitats in Australia and New Zealand.
