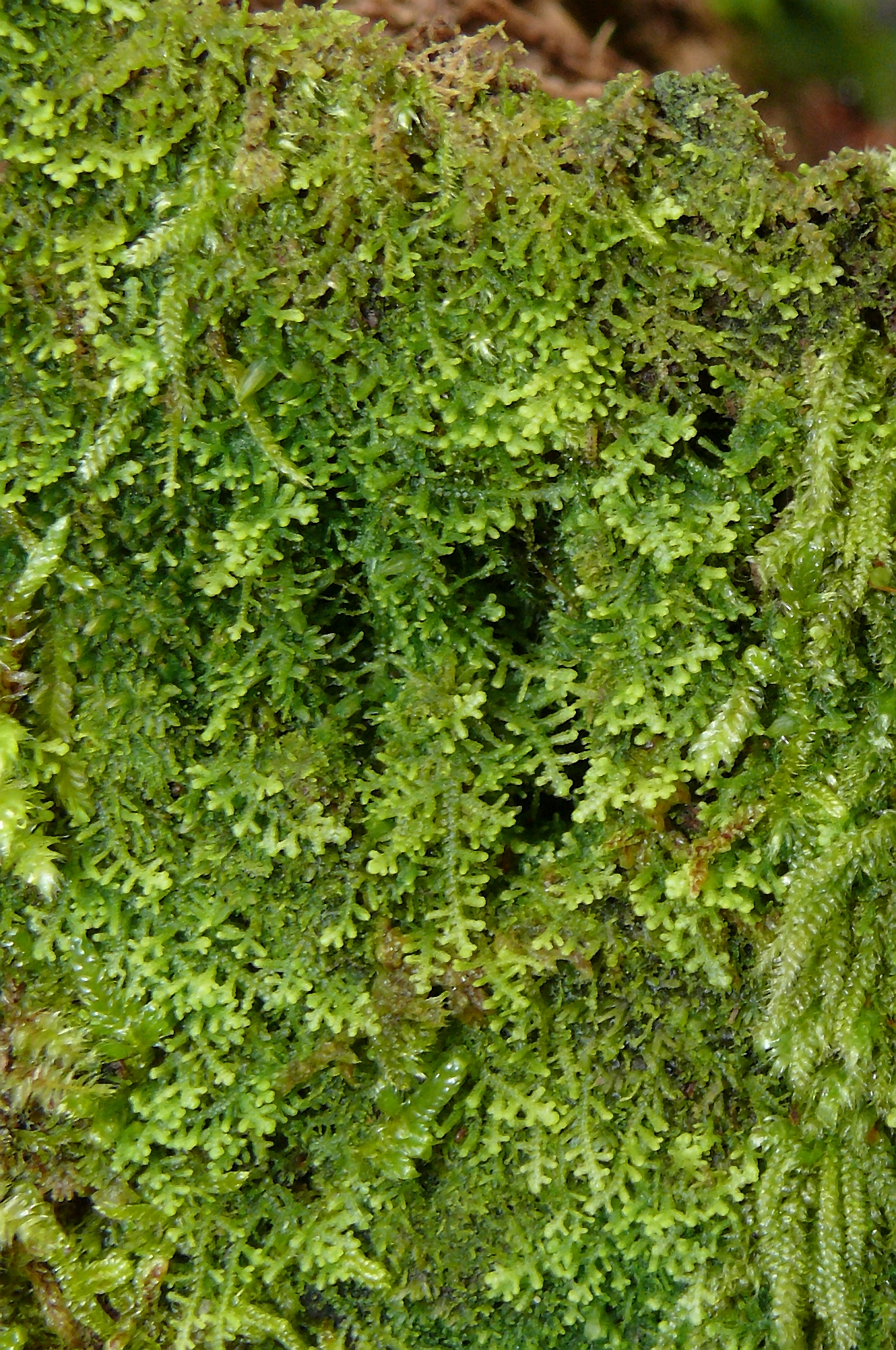

Scientific classification
- Kingdom: Plantae
- Division: Marchantiophyta
- Class: Jungermanniopsida
- Order: Lepidoziales
- Family: Lepidoziaceae
- Genus: Lepidozia
- Species: L. reptans

Binomial name
- Lepidozia reptans (L.) Dumort.

= Lepidozia reptans =

Species of liverwort

Lepidozia reptans is a species of liverwort belonging to the family Lepidoziaceae.

It has cosmopolitan distribution.
