= Kurzia sinensis =

Conservation status
- Critically Endangered (IUCN 2.3)

Scientific classification
- Kingdom: Plantae
- Division: Marchantiophyta
- Class: Jungermanniopsida
- Order: Lepidoziales
- Family: Lepidoziaceae
- Genus: Kurzia
- Species: K. sinensis

Binomial name
- Kurzia sinensis Chang

Species of liverwort

Kurzia sinensis is a species of liverworts in the family Lepidoziaceae. It is endemic to China. Its natural habitat is temperate forests. It is threatened by habitat loss.
