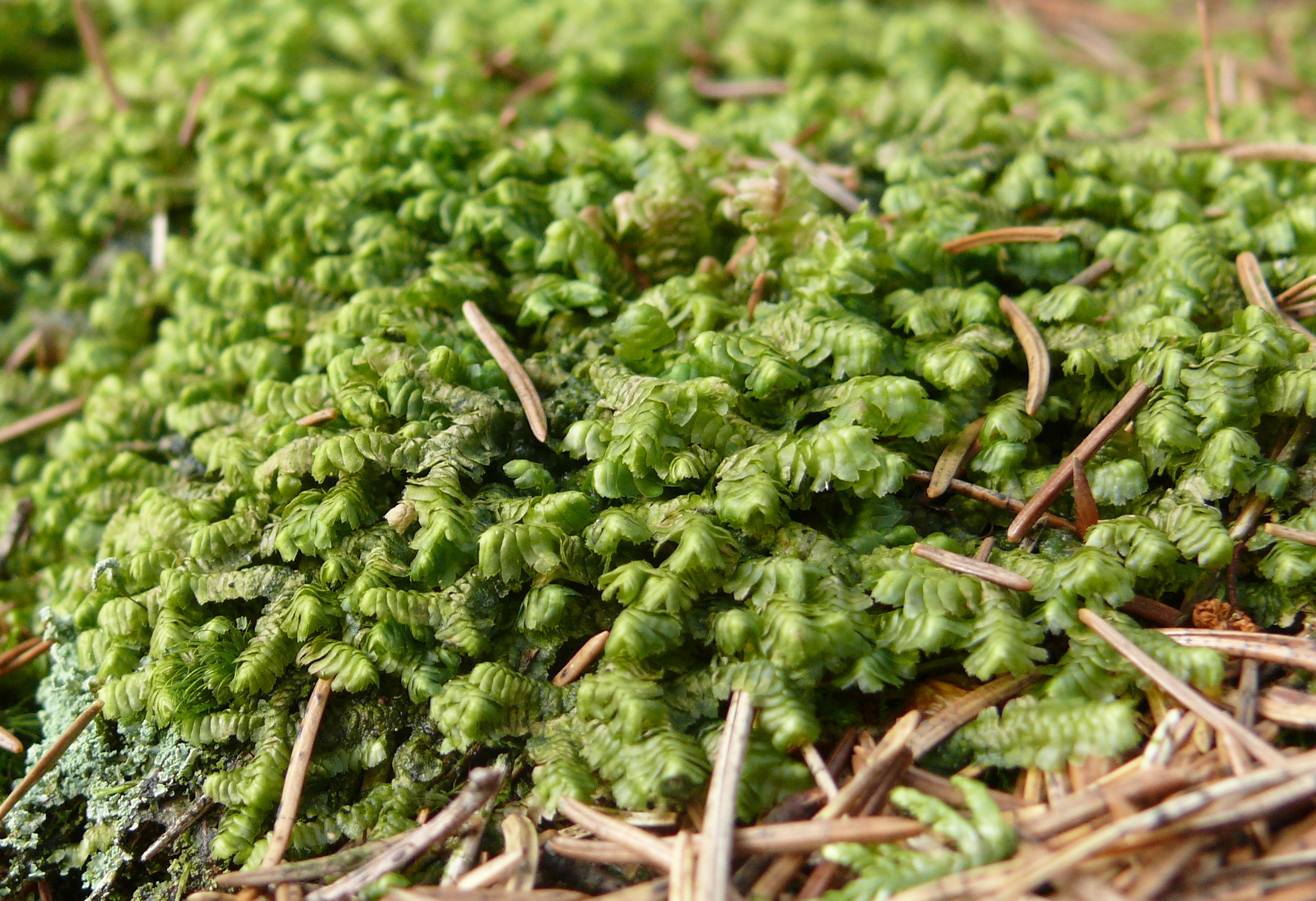

Scientific classification
- Kingdom: Plantae
- Division: Marchantiophyta
- Class: Jungermanniopsida
- Order: Lepidoziales
- Family: Lepidoziaceae
- Genus: Bazzania
- Species: B. trilobata

Binomial name
- Bazzania trilobata (L.) Gray

Synonyms
- Bazzania tridentoides W.E. Nicholson; Bazzania trilobata var. trilobata

= Bazzania trilobata =

Species of liverwort

Bazzania trilobata, the greater whipwort or threelobed bazzania, is a species of liverwort in the Lepidoziaceae family. It grows in the Northern Hemisphere temperate zone.

== Anatomy ==
Leafy liverworts have three rows of small leaves, two lateral in one plane and one ventral, differing from mosses which have small leaves that are usually in more than three rows around the stem. The leaves of leafy liverworts are often dissected or lobed. It is one of the largest leafy liverworts.

== Subspecies ==
- Bazzania trilobata var. depauperata (K. Müller) Grolle
