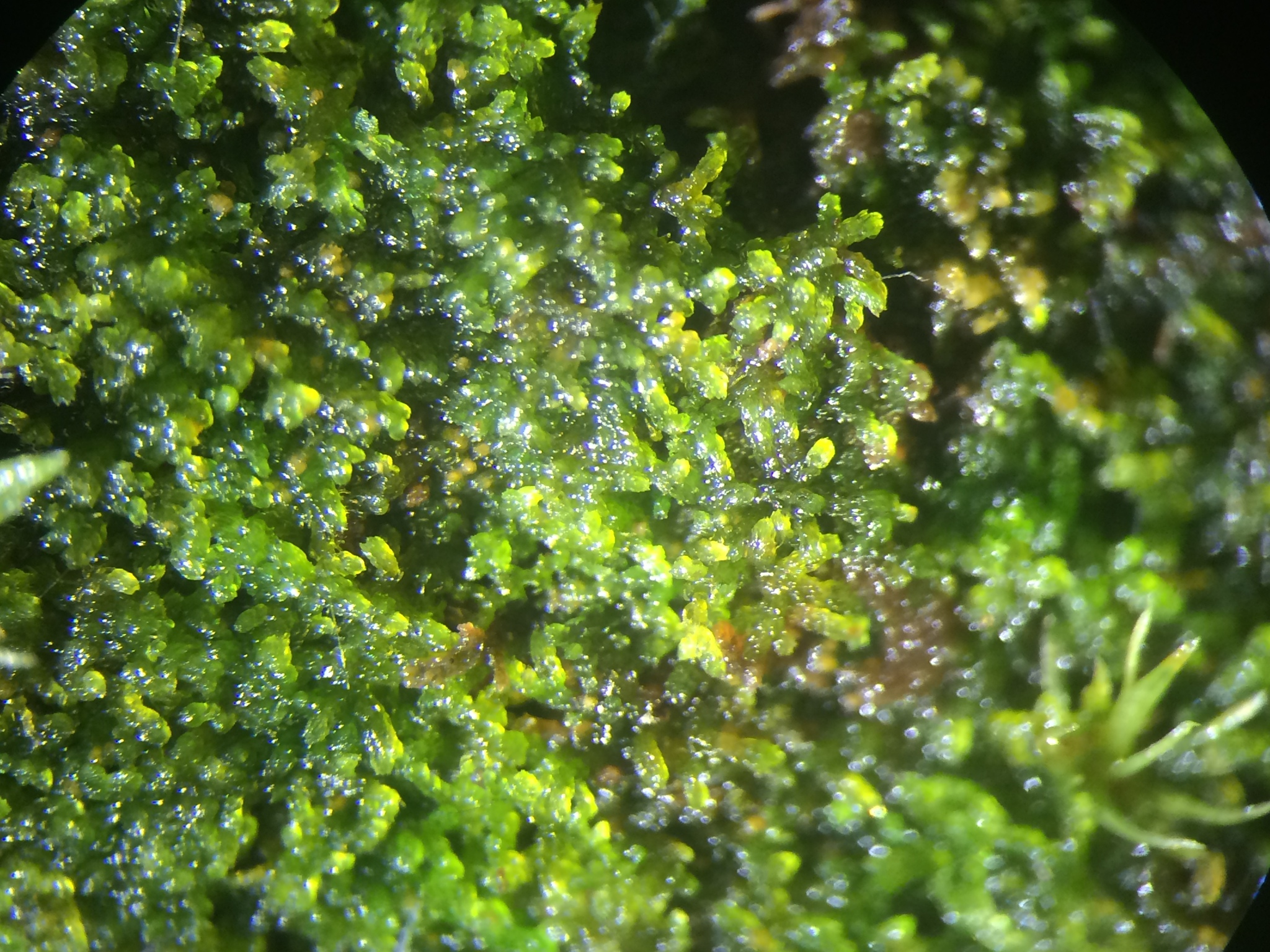

Scientific classification
- Kingdom: Plantae
- Division: Marchantiophyta
- Class: Jungermanniopsida
- Order: Lepidoziales
- Family: Lepidoziaceae
- Genus: Kurzia
- Species: K. pauciflora

Binomial name
- Kurzia pauciflora (Dicks.) Grolle

= Kurzia pauciflora =

Species of liverwort

Kurzia pauciflora is a species of liverwort belonging to the family Lepidoziaceae.

It is native to Eurasia and Northern America.
