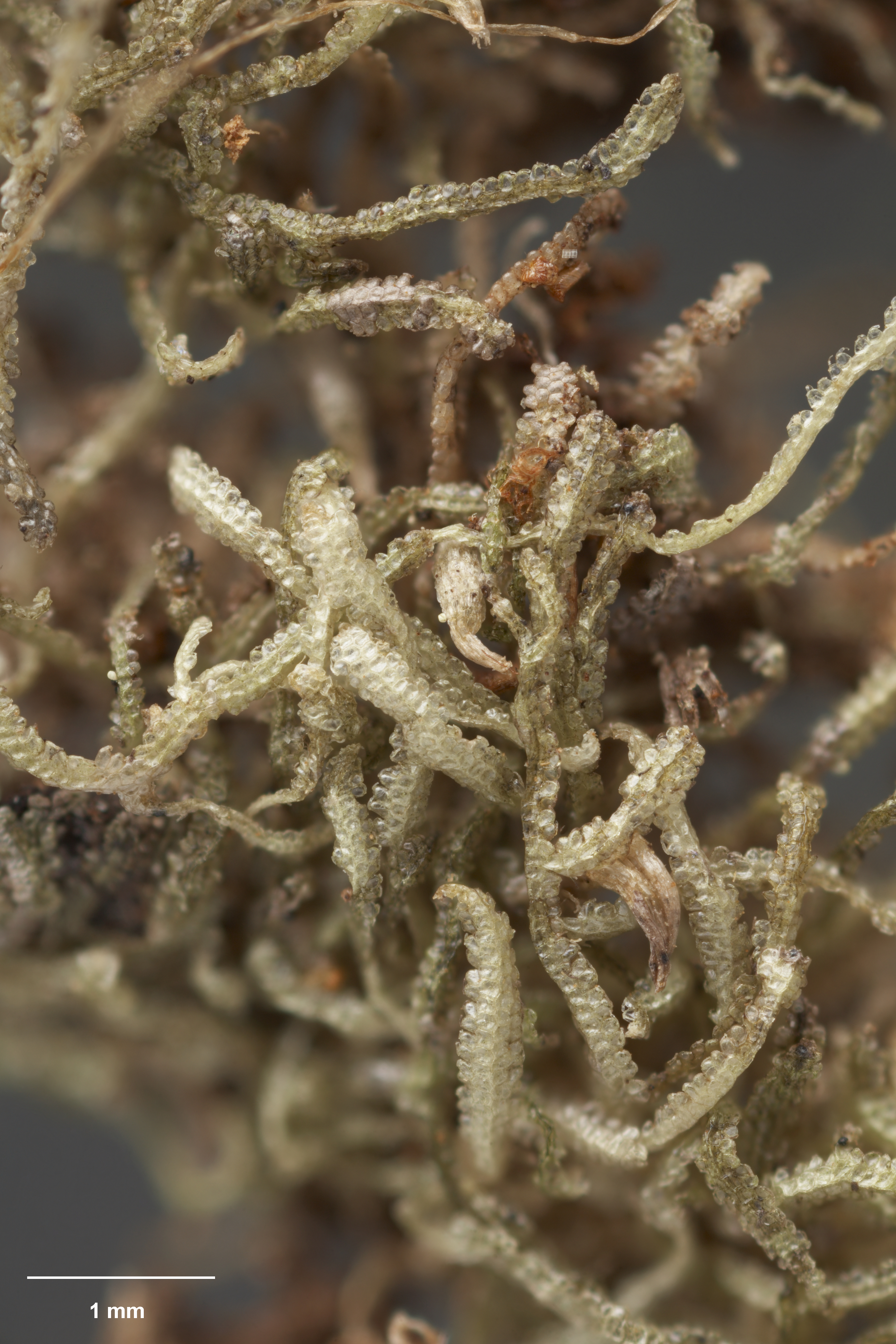
- Type specimen from the collections of Te Papa

Scientific classification
- Kingdom: Plantae
- Division: Marchantiophyta
- Class: Jungermanniopsida
- Order: Lepidoziales
- Family: Lepidoziaceae
- Genus: Zoopsis
- Species: Z. nitida

Binomial name
- Zoopsis nitida Glenny, Braggins & Schust, 1997

= Zoopsis nitida =

Species of liverwort

Zoopsis nitida is a species of liverwort in the family Lepidoziaceae. The species was first described by David Glenny, John E. Braggins and Rudolf M. Schuster in 1997.

== Etymology ==
The specific epithet nitida refers to the shiny appearance of fresh specimens.

== Description ==
Zoopsis nitida has a glossy, dark-green colour. It can be distinguished from other New Zealand Zoopsis species by its lack of lateral leaves on mature plant stems.

== Distribution and habitat ==
Zoopsis nitida is endemic to New Zealand, and has been found in the North Island, South Island and on Campbell Island, New Zealand. The holotype of the species was collected during the 10th John Child Bryological Workshop, held in the Waipoua Forest of the Northland Region in November 1994, found among rotting bark of northern rātā roots, alongside the Acrobolbaceae liverwort Saccogynidium australe.
