= Lepidozia bragginsiana =

Conservation status
- Not Threatened (NZ TCS)

Scientific classification
- Kingdom: Plantae
- Division: Marchantiophyta
- Class: Jungermanniopsida
- Order: Lepidoziales
- Family: Lepidoziaceae
- Genus: Lepidozia
- Species: L. bragginsiana

Binomial name
- Lepidozia bragginsiana E.D.Cooper & M.A.M.Renner, 2014

Species of liverwort

Lepidozia bragginsiana is a species of liverwort in the order Jungermanniales, native to New Zealand. The species was first described by Endymion Dante Cooper and Matthew Anton Martyn Renner in 2014.

== Etymology ==
The species was named after New Zealand bryologist John E. Braggins.

== Description ==
The species is pale green to golden yellow-green in colour, and can be distinguished from other Lepidozia species by its bipinnate branching, erect primary shoots and wide-spreading leaves on primary shoots.

== Genetics ==
The species forms a clade with Lepidozia concinna and Lepidozia pendulina. All three species are endemic to New Zealand.

== Distribution and habitat ==
Lepidozia bragginsiana is endemic to New Zealand, found primarily in humid forested areas of the West Coast Region of the South Island, at an elevation between approximately 200 m (660 ft) and 1,000 m (3,300 ft).
