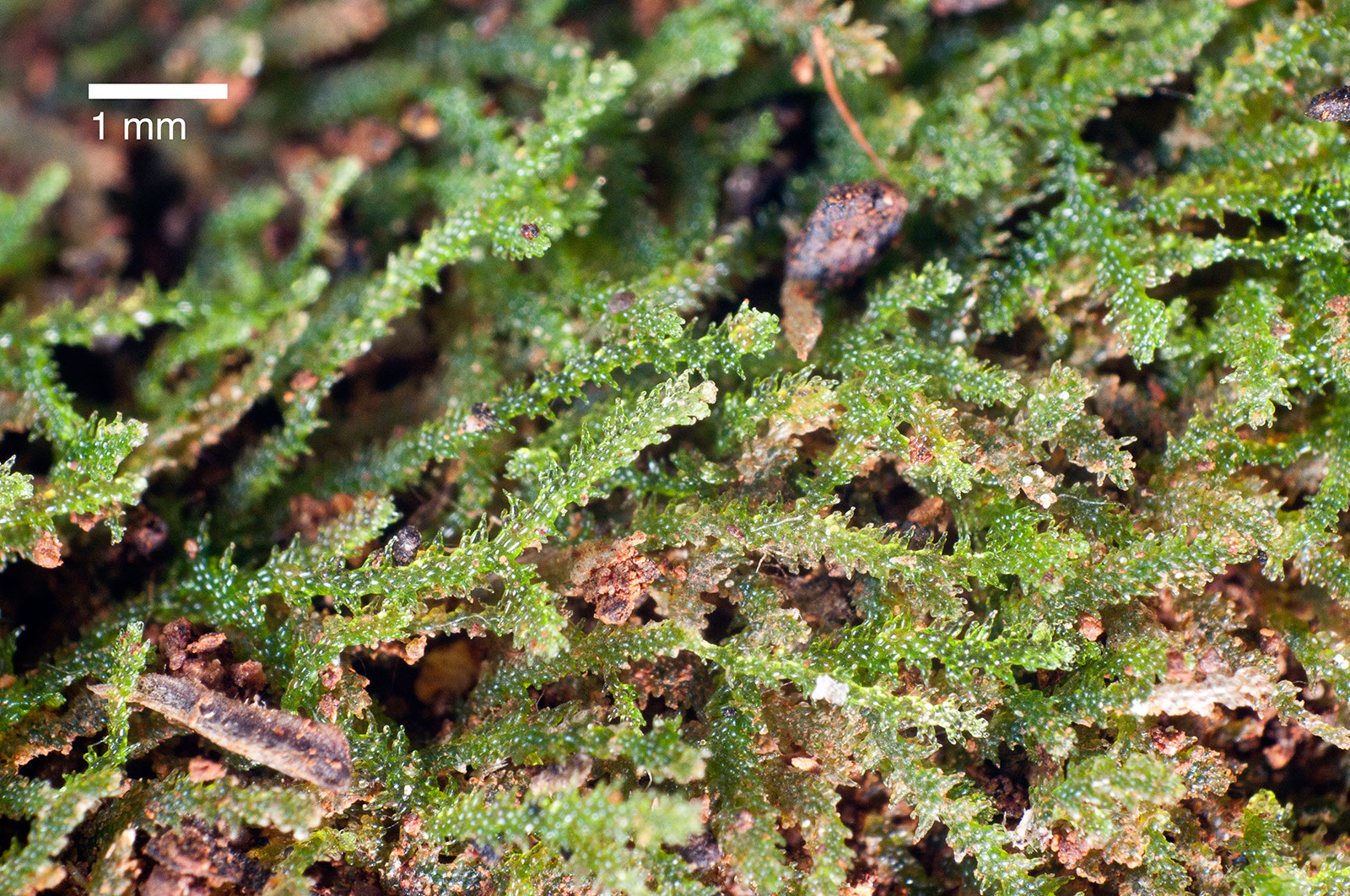
- Zoopsis leitgebiana

Scientific classification
- Kingdom: Plantae
- Division: Marchantiophyta
- Class: Jungermanniopsida
- Order: Lepidoziales
- Family: Lepidoziaceae
- Genus: Zoopsis (Hook. f. et T.Taylor) Gottsche, Lindenb. & Nees

Species
- See text

= Zoopsis =

Genus of liverworts

Zoopsis is a genus of liverwort in the family Lepidoziaceae. The genus was first formally described by Carl Moritz Gottsche, Johann Bernhard Wilhelm Lindenberg and Christian Gottfried Daniel Nees von Esenbeck in 1886, based on descriptions found in Joseph Dalton Hooker's Flora Antarctica (1844), who described Zoopsis as a subgenus of Jungermannia. The type species is Zoopsis argentea.

== Species and subspecies ==
It contains the following species:

- Zoopsis argentea (Hook.f. & Taylor) Gottsche, Lindenb. & Nees
- Zoopsis bicruris Glenny & E.A.Br.
- Zoopsis ceratophylla (Spruce) Hamlin
- Zoopsis ciliata Colenso
- Zoopsis leitgebiana (Carrington & Pearson) Bastow
- Zoopsis liukiuensis Horik.
- Zoopsis macrophylla R.M.Schust.
- Zoopsis martinicensis Steph.
- Zoopsis matawaia M.A.M.Renner
- Zoopsis nitida Glenny, Braggins & R.M.Schust.
- Zoopsis setigera K.I.Goebel
- Zoopsis setulosa Leitg.
- Zoopsis uleana Steph.
