= Ceramanus elegans =

Scientific classification
- Kingdom: Plantae
- Division: Marchantiophyta
- Class: Jungermanniopsida
- Order: Lepidoziales
- Family: Lepidoziaceae
- Genus: Ceramanus
- Species: C. elegans

Binomial name
- Ceramanus elegans (Colenso) E.D.Cooper, 2013

Synonyms
- Telaranea elegans (Colenso) J.J.Engel & G.L.Merr., 1888

Species of liverwort

Ceramanus elegans is a species of leafy liverworts in the family Lepidoziaceae. It is found in New Zealand.

The type specimen has registration number H007861 at the Museum of New Zealand. The type locality was Great Barrier Island, North Island, North Auckland.
