= Lepidozia pearsonii =

Scientific classification
- Kingdom: Plantae
- Division: Marchantiophyta
- Class: Jungermanniopsida
- Order: Lepidoziales
- Family: Lepidoziaceae
- Genus: Lepidozia
- Species: L. pearsonii

Binomial name
- Lepidozia pearsonii Spruce

Species of liverwort

Lepidozia pearsonii is a species of liverwort belonging to the family Lepidoziaceae.

Variety:

- Lepidozia pearsonii var. lacerata (Stephani) Pocs
