= Telaranea azorica =

Conservation status
- Endangered (IUCN 3.1)

Scientific classification
- Kingdom: Plantae
- Division: Marchantiophyta
- Class: Jungermanniopsida
- Order: Lepidoziales
- Family: Lepidoziaceae
- Genus: Telaranea
- Species: T. azorica

Binomial name
- Telaranea azorica (H. Buch & Perss.) Pócs ex Schumacker & VáňaLepidozia

Synonyms
- Lepidozia azorica Buch & Perss.

Species of liverwort

Telaranea azorica is a species of liverwort in the family Lepidoziaceae. It is found on the Iberian Peninsula and on the Canary Islands.
