= Bazzania bhutanica =

Conservation status
- Critically Endangered (IUCN 2.3)

Scientific classification
- Kingdom: Plantae
- Division: Marchantiophyta
- Class: Jungermanniopsida
- Order: Lepidoziales
- Family: Lepidoziaceae
- Genus: Bazzania
- Species: B. bhutanica

Binomial name
- Bazzania bhutanica N.Kitag. & Grolle

Species of liverwort

Bazzania bhutanica is a species of liverwort in the family Lepidoziaceae. It is a critically endangered species known only from the eastern Himalayas of Bhutan and northeast India.

== Taxonomy and history ==
Bazzania bhutanica was described by Naofumi Kitagawa and Riclef Grolle in 1987 based on a type specimen collected in 1982 by David G. Long near Samtse, Bhutan. It would be known only from the type locality until 27 years later when, in 2009, plants were located at both the type locality and at a new site near Lafeti Khola, Bhutan. The species was first recorded outside of Bhutan in 2014, when it was discovered in West Siang District, Arunachal Pradesh, India.

== Distribution and habitat ==
Endemic to the tropical eastern Himalayas, Bazzania bhutanica is known only from two locations in Bhutan and one location in northeast India.

In Bhutan, both locations can be found west of the town of Samtse in Samtse District. The two locations are ecologically similar, both being stream valleys located in degraded subtropical forests at 255–256 m (837–840 ft) above sea level. Plants at both sites were found growing on gravelly, vertical rock faces above streams and shaded by overhanging shrubs.

In India, B. bhutanica has only been found growing at once location, an eastern Himalayan tropical forest at 680 m (2,230 ft) above sea level in the state of Arunachal Pradesh. Plants were found growing terrestrially on the humus-rich soil of the forest floor.

== Description ==
Bazzania bhutanica is a small liverwort, similar in appearance to Acromastigum, that grows in thin, loosely interwoven mats. The shoots measure 15–20 mm (0.59–0.79 in) long and 1–2 mm (0.039–0.079 in) wide including the leaves. The fragile leaves may overlap slightly or not at all. The leaves are oblong-ovate to oblong-lanceolate in shape and deeply bilobed, forming a "V" shape. Fertile plants have not been described.

== Ecology ==
Bazzania bhutanica has been observed as a terrestrial plant growing on the ground and as a lithophyte growing on rock faces. In Bhutan it has been observed growing in association with the liverworts Bazzania tridens and Pallavicinia lyellii, ferns of the genus Hymenophyllum, and mosses of the genus Fissidens. In India it has been observed growing in association with the liverworts Bazzania sumbavensis, Calypogeia arguta, Frullania apiculata, Radula obscura, and species of Jungermannia and Pallavicinia.

== Conservation status ==
Bazzania bhutanica is listed as critically endangered on the International Union for the Conservation of Nature Red List under criteria B1 and B2c, based on its limited distribution and the apparent decline of its habitat. In Bhutan, both known locations are threatened by deforestation, overgrazing, and industrial and housing development. In India, slash-and-burn agriculture may also be a threat.
