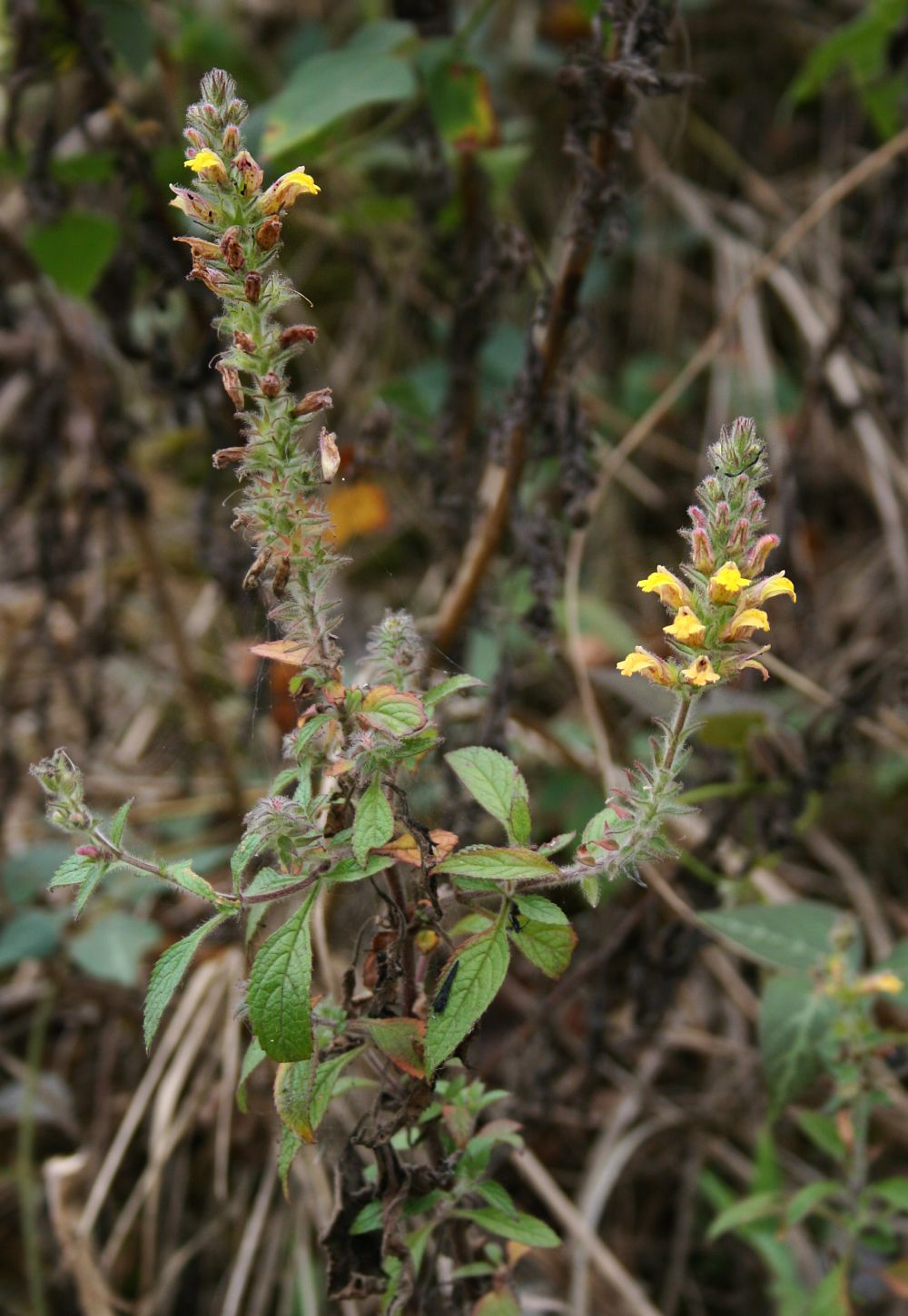
- Lindenbergia philippensis

Scientific classification
- Kingdom: Plantae
- Clade: Tracheophytes
- Clade: Angiosperms
- Clade: Eudicots
- Clade: Asterids
- Order: Lamiales
- Family: Orobanchaceae
- Genus: Lindenbergia; Lehm.

Synonyms
- Bovea Decne.; Brachycorys Schrad.; Omania S.Moore

= Lindenbergia =

Genus of flowering plants in the broomrape family

Lindenbergia is a genus of herbaceous plants in the order Lamiales and in the broomrape family Orobanchaceae. It is one of the few genera of the family which are not parasitic. It contains about 15 species found from northeast Africa across Asia to the Philippines, and is most abundant in India.

== Taxonomy ==
The genus Lindenbergia was erected by Johann Lehmann in 1829. It is named in honor of Johann Bernhard Wilhelm Lindenberg, a lawyer and bryologist from Germany. Lindenbergia was originally placed in the family Scrophulariaceae. Molecular phylogenetic studies have caused that family to be split up, with many genera, including Lindenbergia, placed in a greatly expanded family Orobanchaceae.

Lindenbergia has been placed in the tribe Lindenbergieae, one of two basal clades in the family Orobanchaceae that are not parasitic:

- - Rehmannia-Triaenophora clade
  - - Lindenbergia clade (Lindenbergieae)
    - remaining Orobanchaceae

== Species ==
As of March 2022, Plants of the World Online accepted the following species:

- Lindenbergia arabica (S.Moore) Hartl
- Lindenbergia awashensis Hjertson
- Lindenbergia fengkaiensis R.H.Miau & Q.Y.Cen
- Lindenbergia fruticosa Benth.
- Lindenbergia grandiflora Benth.
- Lindenbergia griffithii Hook.f.
- Lindenbergia hookeri C.B.Clarke ex Hook.f.
- Lindenbergia indica (L.) Vatke
- Lindenbergia luchunensis D.D.Tao & Y.M.Shui
- Lindenbergia macrostachya (Benth.) Benth.
- Lindenbergia muraria (Roxb. ex D.Don) Brühl, syn. Lindenbergia urticifolia Lehm.
- Lindenbergia philippensis (Cham. & Schltdl.) Benth.
- Lindenbergia serpyllifolia Hjertson
- Lindenbergia sokotrana Vierh.
- Lindenbergia titensis Sikdar & Maiti
