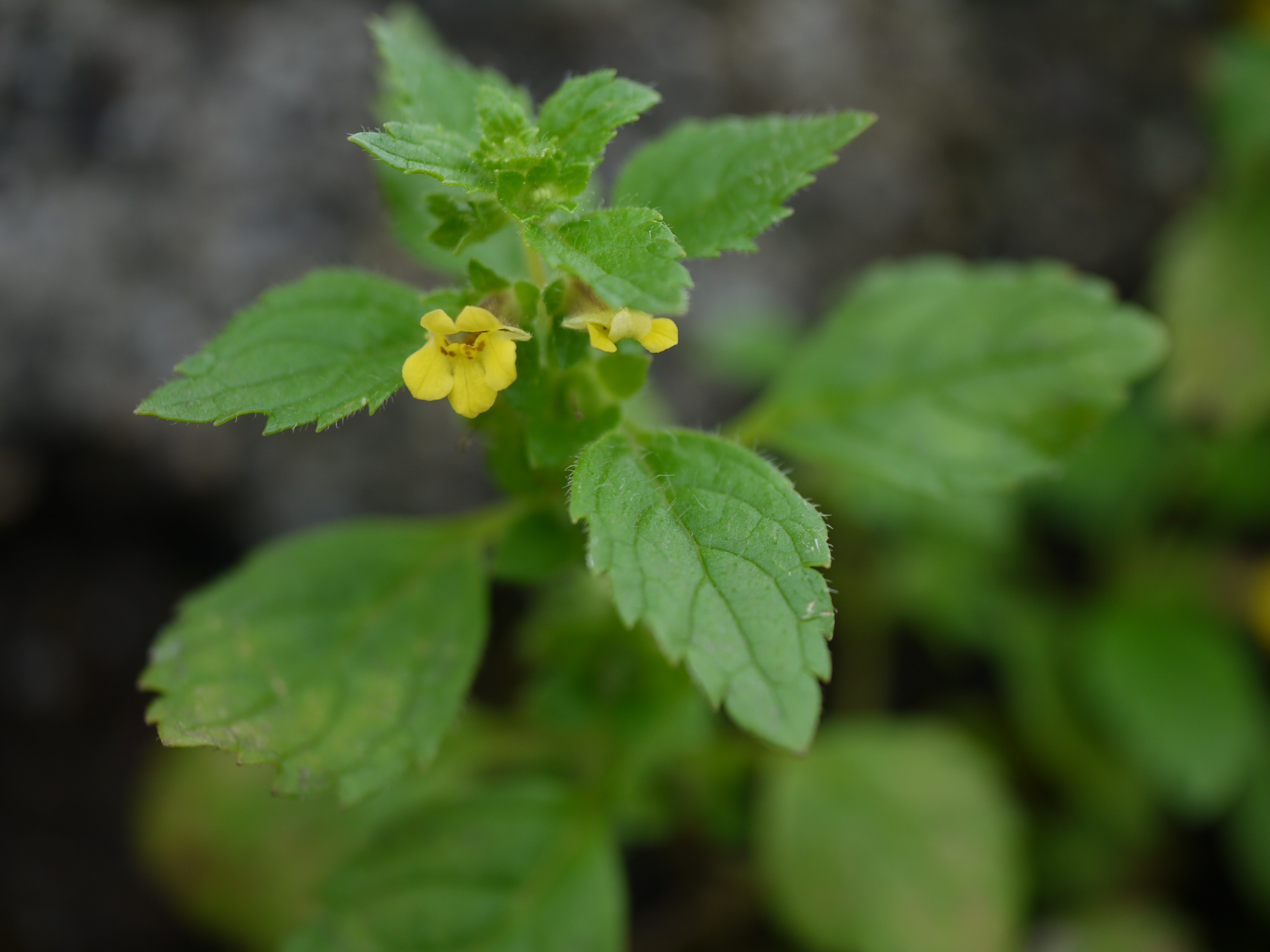

Scientific classification
- Kingdom: Plantae
- Clade: Tracheophytes
- Clade: Angiosperms
- Clade: Eudicots
- Clade: Asterids
- Order: Lamiales
- Family: Orobanchaceae
- Genus: Lindenbergia
- Species: L. muraria

Binomial name
- Lindenbergia muraria (Roxb. ex D.Don) Brühl

Synonyms
- Brachycorys parviflora Schrad.; Lindenbergia pusilla Hochst. ex Chiov.; Lindenbergia urticifolia Lehm.; Stemodia littoralis Boiss.; Stemodia muraria Roxb. ex D.Don

= Lindenbergia muraria =

Species of flowering plant in the broomrape family

Lindenbergia muraria, synonym Lindenbergia urticifolia, is a flowering plant in the family Orobanchaceae, native from Ethiopia to south China and Indo-China. It is a common plant throughout India. It is an annual herb growing up to 40 cm (16 in) tall. It grows along trailsides, along rivers and dry mountain slopes.

It has a faint aromatic odour and a slightly bitter taste, and has been used to treat skin problems and bronchitis.
