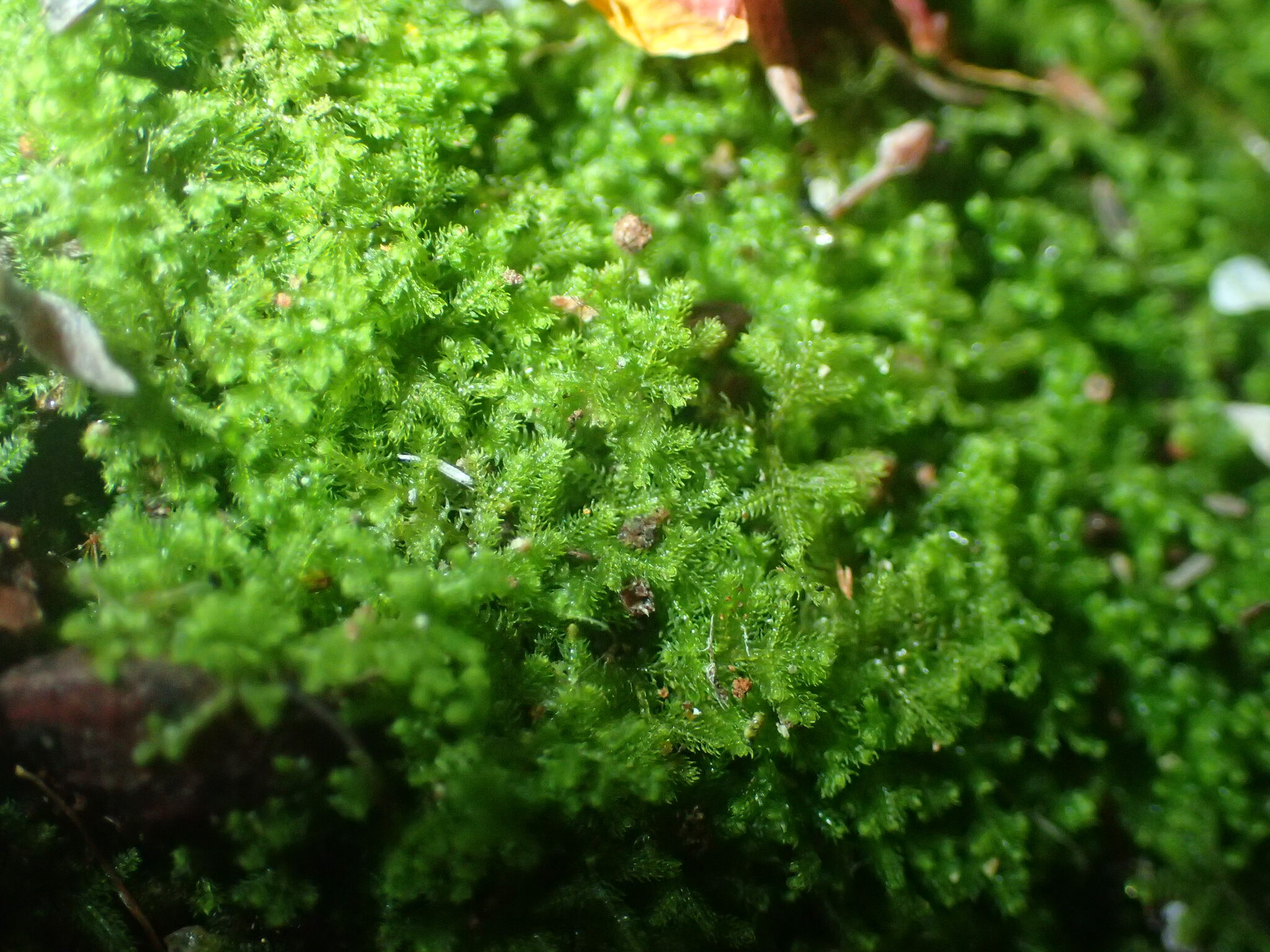
- Kurzia compacta

Scientific classification
- Kingdom: Plantae
- Division: Marchantiophyta
- Class: Jungermanniopsida
- Order: Lepidoziales
- Family: Lepidoziaceae
- Genus: Kurzia; G.Martens, 1870

= Kurzia =

Genus of liverworts

Kurzia is a genus of liverworts in the family Lepidoziaceae. It contains the following species (but this list may be incomplete). Kurzia crenacanthoidea G. Martens is a synonym of Kurzia gonyotricha (Sande Lac.) Grolle.

The leaves of typically have 3–6 lobes, often with smaller teeth at the sides of the lobes.

== Species ==
Accepted species (57)

1. Kurzia abbreviata Mizut.
2. Kurzia abietinella (Herzog) Grolle
3. Kurzia allisonii (Herzog) Grolle
4. Kurzia amazonica (Spruce) Grolle
5. Kurzia bisetula (Stephani) Grolle
6. Kurzia borneensis Mizut.
7. Kurzia brasiliensis (Stephani) Grolle
8. Kurzia brevicalycina (Stephani) Grolle
9. Kurzia calcarata (Stephani) Grolle
10. Kurzia capillaris (Sw.) Grolle
11. Kurzia compacta (Stephani) Grolle
12. Kurzia cucullifolia (Stephani) R.M. Schust.
13. Kurzia dendroides (Carrington & Pearson) Grolle
14. Kurzia flagellifera (Stephani) Grolle
15. Kurzia fragilifolia R.M. Schust.
16. Kurzia fragillima (Herzog) Grolle
17. Kurzia geniculata Mizut.
18. Kurzia gonyotricha (Sande Lac.) Grolle
19. Kurzia hainanensis D.K. Li & Z. K. Bai
20. Kurzia hawaica (C.M. Cooke) Grolle
21. Kurzia helophila R.M. Schust.
22. Kurzia herzogiana (Steph.) R.M. Schust.
23. Kurzia hippuroides (Hook. f. & Taylor) Grolle
24. Kurzia hispida (Stephani) Grolle
25. Kurzia insulana (W. Martin & E.A. Hodgs.) Grolle
26. Kurzia irregularis (Stephani) Grolle
27. Kurzia lateconica (Stephani) Grolle
28. Kurzia lineariloba Mizut.
29. Kurzia longicaulis Piippo
30. Kurzia makinoana Grolle
31. Kurzia mauiensis (H.A. Mill.) H.A. Mill.
32. Kurzia mollis (Stephani) J.J. Engel & R.M. Schust.
33. Kurzia moniliformis J.J. Engel
34. Kurzia nemoides (Hook. f. & Taylor) Grolle
35. Kurzia pallescens Grolle
36. Kurzia pallida Piippo
37. Kurzia pauciflora (Dicks.) Grolle
38. Kurzia quadriseta Grolle
39. Kurzia quinquespina J.J. Engel & G.L. Merr.
40. Kurzia reversa (Carrington & Pearson) Grolle
41. Kurzia saddlensis (Besch. & A. Massal.) Grolle
42. Kurzia setacea (Weber) Grolle
43. Kurzia setiformis (De Not.) J.J. Engel & R.M. Schust.
44. Kurzia sexfida (Stephani) Grolle
45. Kurzia sinensis G.C. Zhang; (Critically Endangered)
46. Kurzia stephanii (Renauld) Grolle
47. Kurzia sylvatica (A. Evans) Grolle
48. Kurzia tabularis (Stephani) Grolle
49. Kurzia tayloriana (H.A. Mill.) H.A. Mill.
50. Kurzia temnomoides R.M. Schust.
51. Kurzia tenax (Grev.) Grolle
52. Kurzia tenerrima (Mitt. ex Stephani) Grolle
53. Kurzia touwii N. Kitag
54. Kurzia trichoclados (K. Müller) Grolle
55. Kurzia uleana (Stephani) Grolle
56. Kurzia verrucosa (Stephani) Grolle
57. Kurzia verticellata (Carrington) Grolle

Unresolved:

1. Kurzia succulenta Grolle
