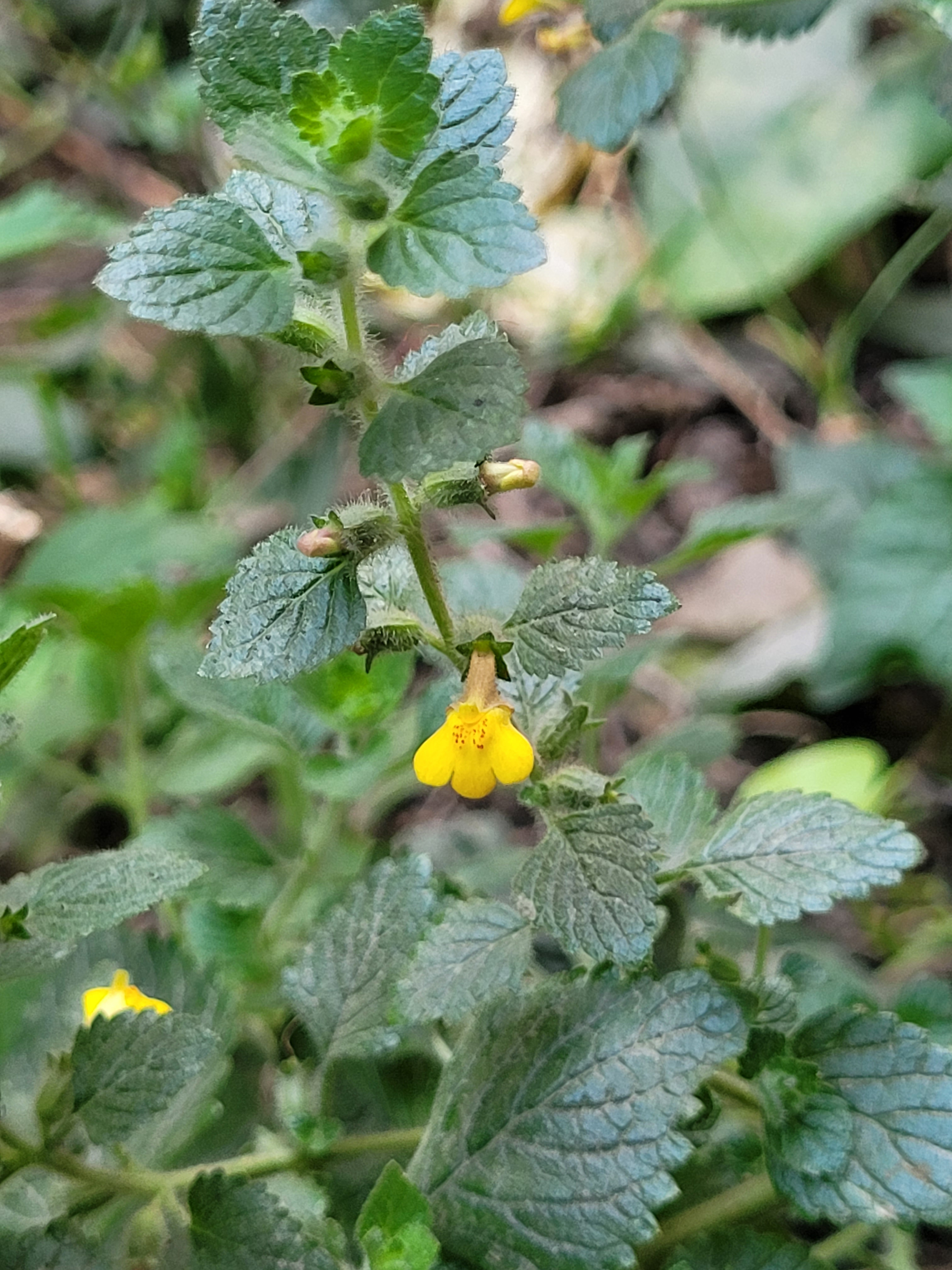

Scientific classification
- Kingdom: Plantae
- Clade: Tracheophytes
- Clade: Angiosperms
- Clade: Eudicots
- Clade: Asterids
- Order: Lamiales
- Family: Orobanchaceae
- Genus: Lindenbergia
- Species: L. indica

Binomial name
- Lindenbergia indica (L.) Vatke

= Lindenbergia indica =

Species of flowering plant

Lindenbergia indica, the Indian pout-flower, is a species of flowering plant in the family Orobanchaceae, native from north-eastern Africa to the Indian subcontinent, where it grows in desert and dry shrubland habitats.

== Gallery ==
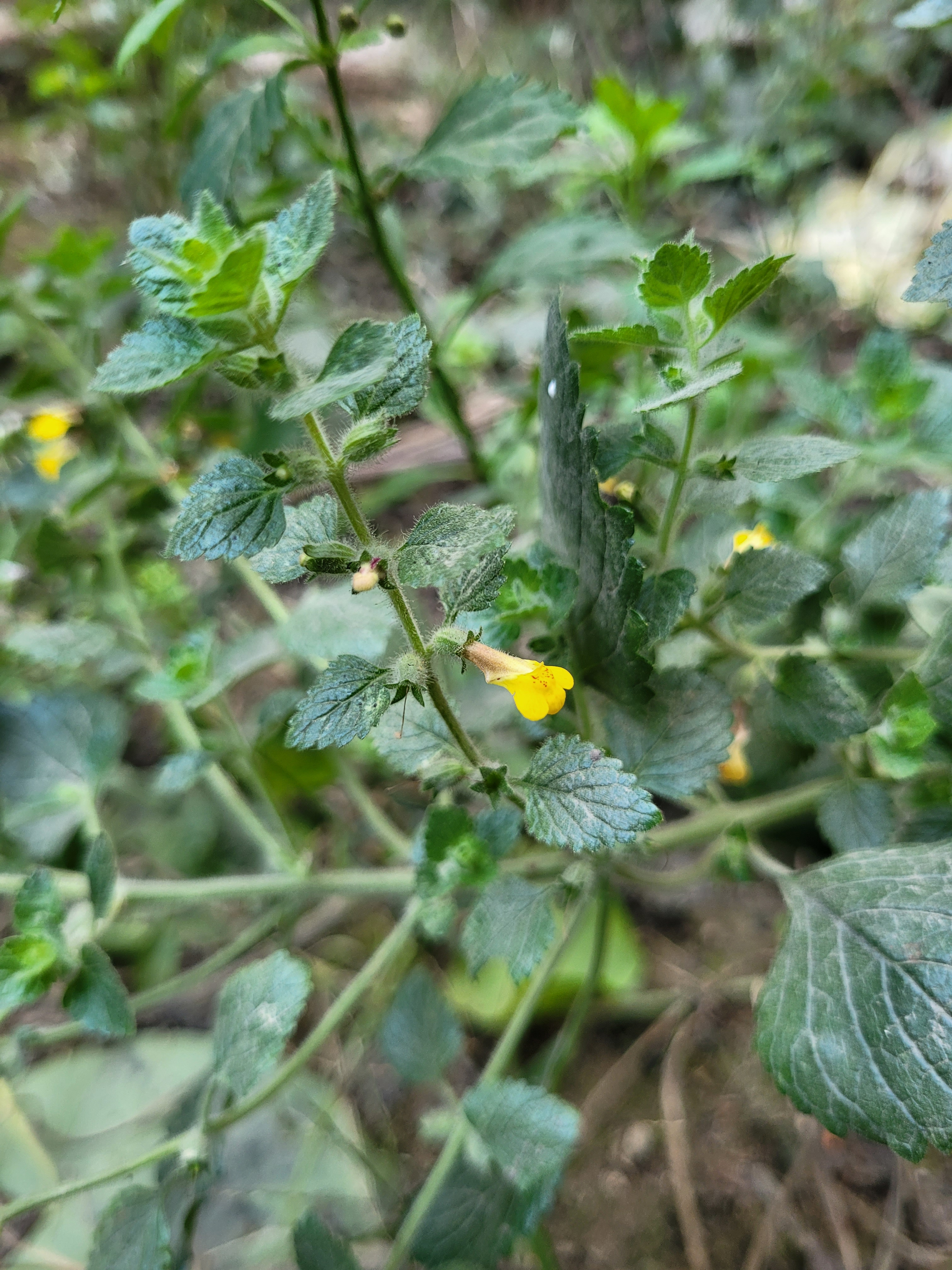
Lindenbergia indica – Indian pout-flower

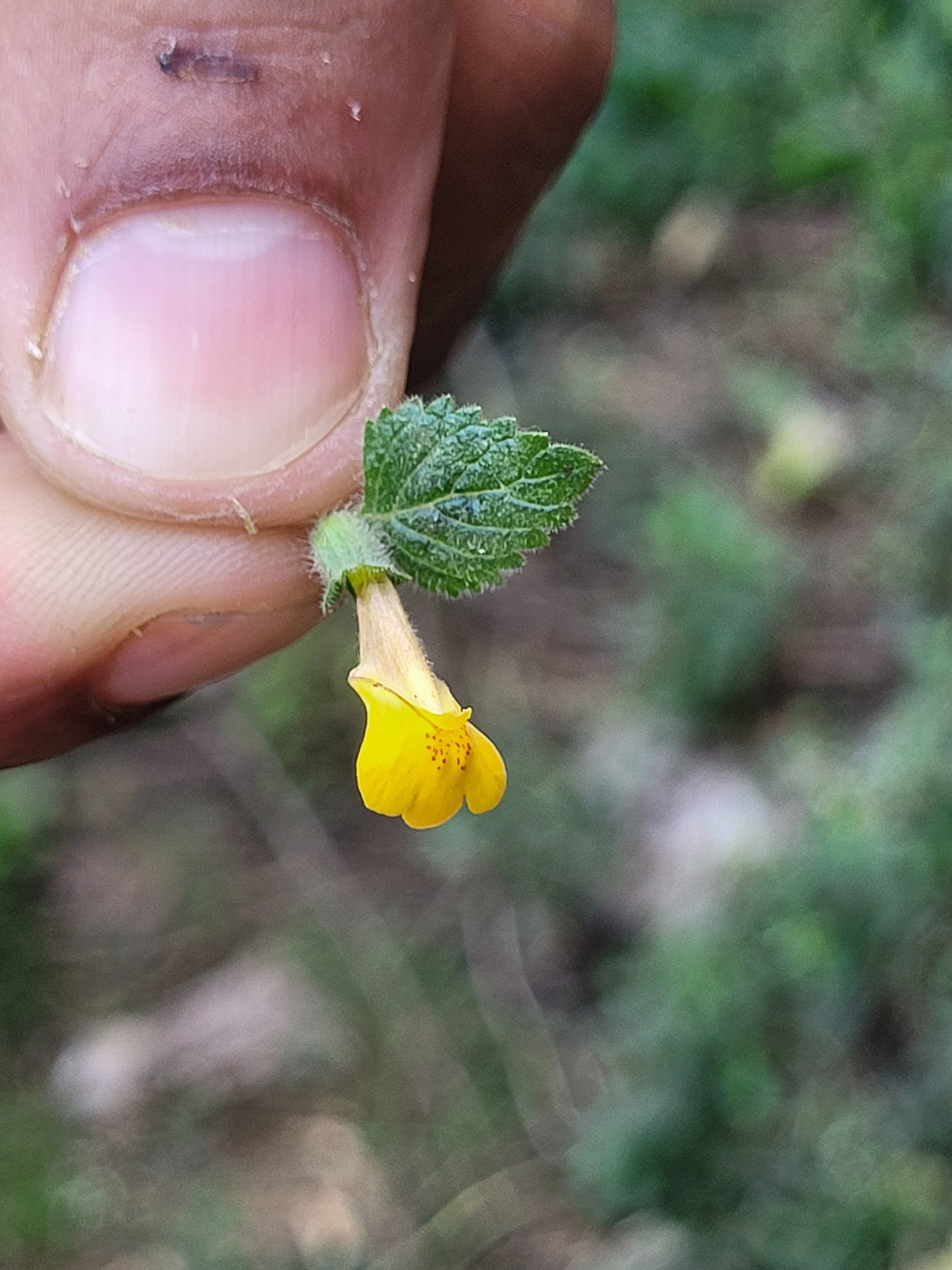
Closeup of flower and a leaf in hand

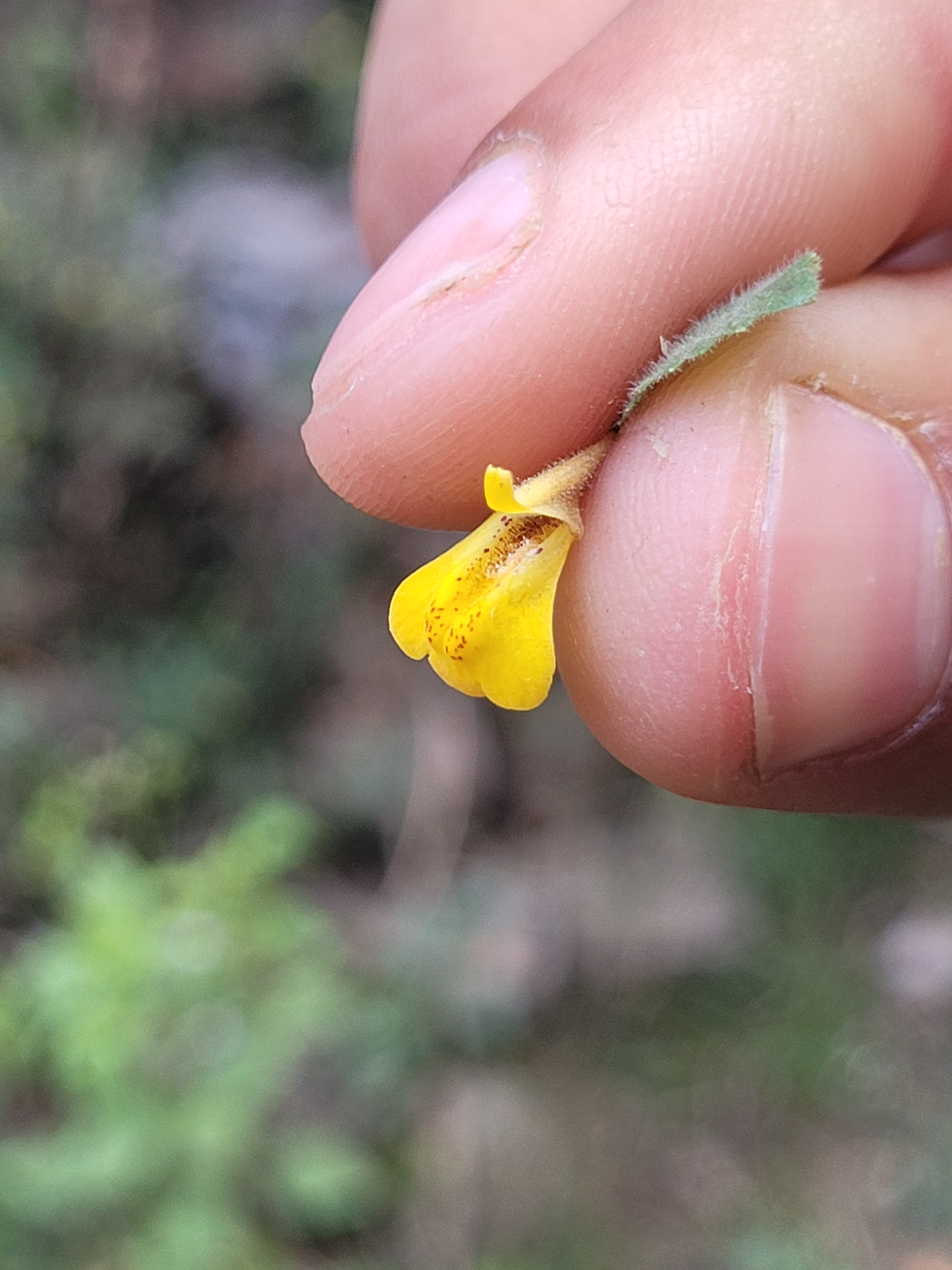
Flower opens when squeezed or when a pollinator lands on it
