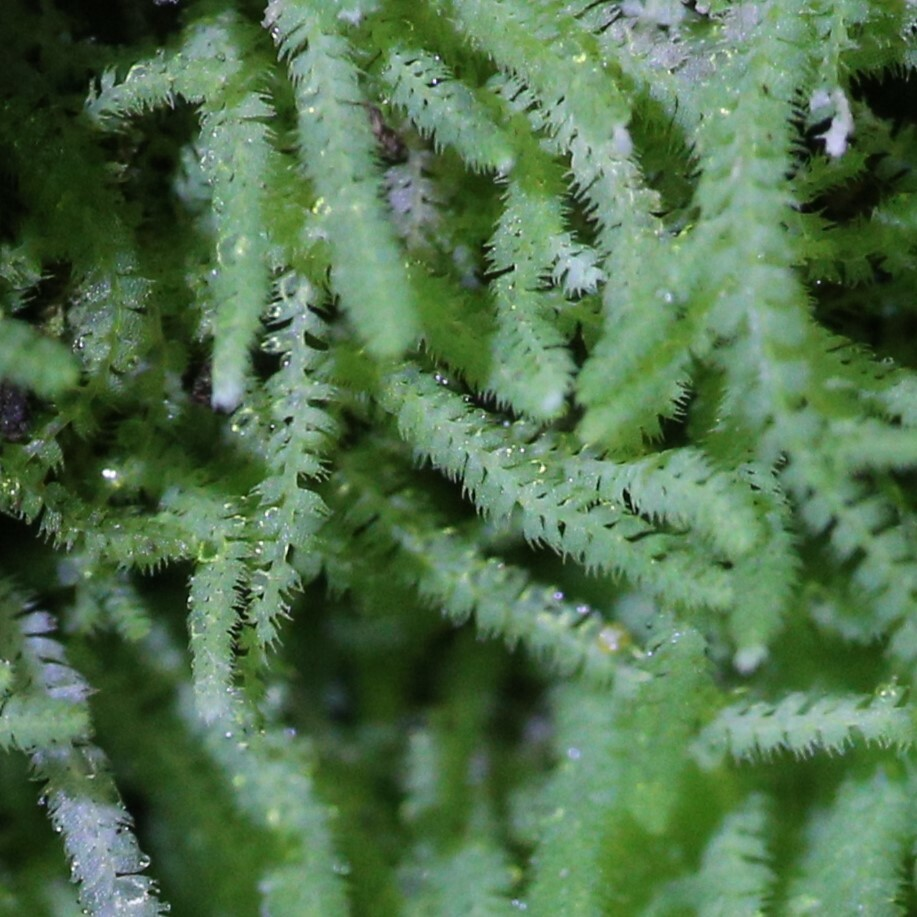
- Ceramanus centipes

Scientific classification
- Kingdom: Plantae
- Division: Marchantiophyta
- Class: Jungermanniopsida
- Order: Lepidoziales
- Family: Lepidoziaceae
- Genus: Ceramanus; E.D.Cooper, 2013

Species
- Ceramanus centipes; Ceramanus clatritexta; Ceramanus elegans; Ceramanus grossiseta; Ceramanus perfragilis; Ceramanus tuberifera

= Ceramanus =

Genus of liverworts

Ceramanus is a genus of leafy liverworts in the family Lepidoziaceae.
