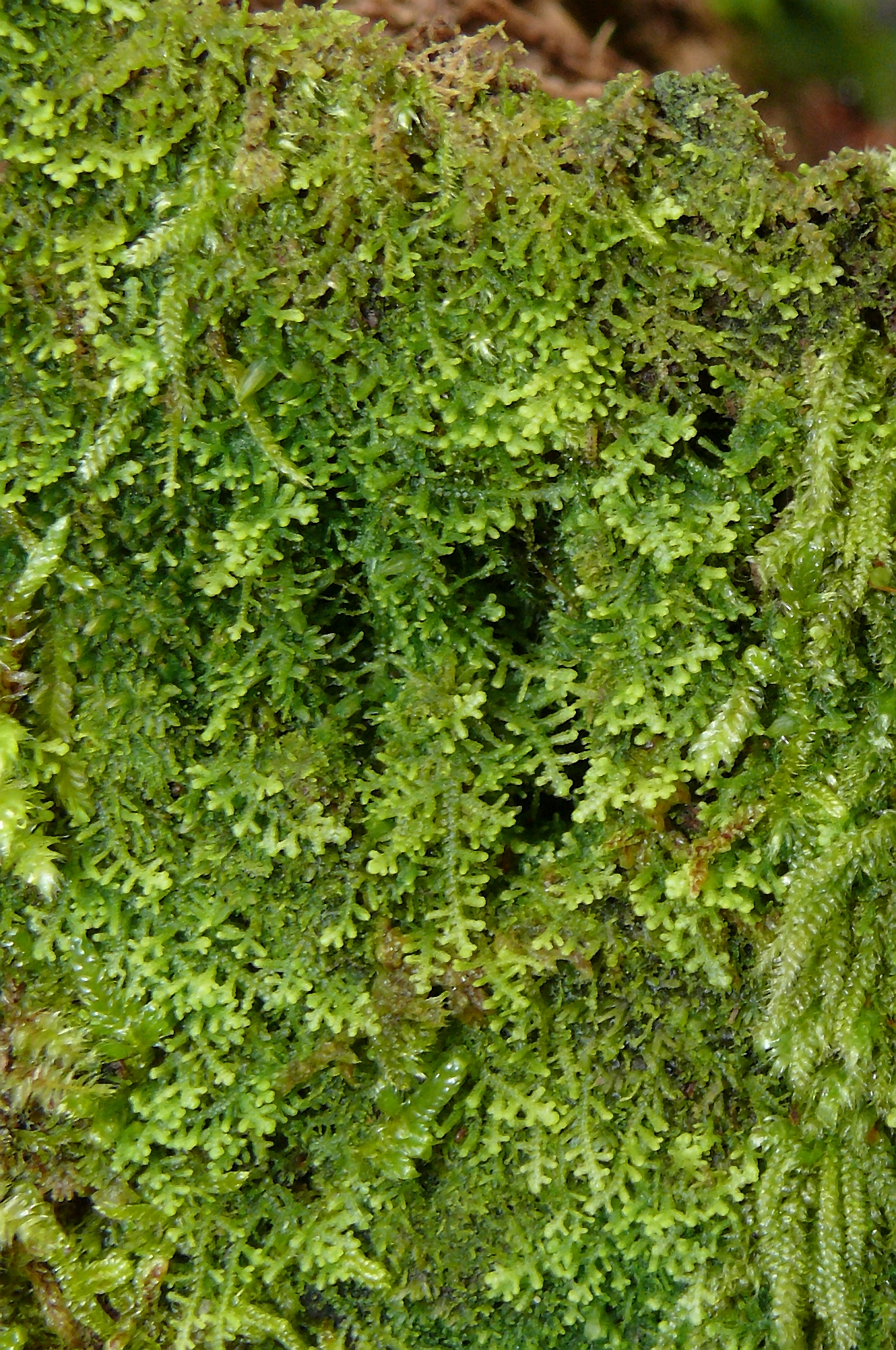
- Lepidozia reptans

Scientific classification
- Kingdom: Plantae
- Division: Marchantiophyta
- Class: Jungermanniopsida
- Order: Lepidoziales
- Family: Lepidoziaceae
- Genus: Lepidozia (Dumort.) Dumort.

Synonyms
- List: Lepidoziopsis E.A. Hodgs.; Mastigophora Nees; Pleuroschisma sect. Lepidozia Dumort.; Sprucella Steph.

= Lepidozia =

Genus of liverworts

Lepidozia is a genus of liverwort in the family Lepidoziaceae. It was first proposed by Dumortier in 1835.

Lepidozia is encompassed within the informal group: leafy II. It has pinnate branching, incubous leaf insertion, as well as leaves and underleaves that are 3-4 lobed and divided <0.5 of their length.

== Species ==
The following species are recognised in the genus Lepidozia:

- Lepidozia acantha J.J. Engel
- Lepidozia aequiloba Steph.
- Lepidozia alstonii Fulford
- Lepidozia ambigua De Not.
- Lepidozia andicola Beauverd
- Lepidozia appressifolia Steph.
- Lepidozia asymmetrica Steph.
- Lepidozia auriculata Mitt. ex Steph.
- Lepidozia australis (Lehm. & Lindenb.) Mitt.
- Lepidozia bidens J.J. Engel
- Lepidozia biloba Herzog
- Lepidozia bisbifida Steph.
- Lepidozia borneensis Steph.
- Lepidozia bragginsiana E.D. Cooper & M.A.M. Renner
- Lepidozia brevidentata Mitt.
- Lepidozia brevifolia Mitt.
- Lepidozia brotheri Steph.
- Lepidozia buffalona Steph.
- Lepidozia bursifera S. Hatt. & Grolle
- Lepidozia caledonica Steph.
- Lepidozia ceramensis Herzog
- Lepidozia cherydrion Hürl.
- Lepidozia chiloensis Steph.
- Lepidozia cladorhiza (Reinw., Blume & Nees) Nees
- Lepidozia coilophylla Taylor
- Lepidozia communis Steph.
- Lepidozia concinna Colenso
- Lepidozia cordata Lindenb.
- Lepidozia cordistipula Steph.
- Lepidozia crassitexta Steph.
- Lepidozia cupressina (Sw.) Lindenb.
- Lepidozia decaisnei Steph.
- Lepidozia dendritica Spruce
- Lepidozia densa Herzog
- Lepidozia digitata Herzog
- Lepidozia eenii S.W. Arnell
- Lepidozia elobata R.M. Schust.
- Lepidozia erosa Steph.
- Lepidozia erronea Herzog
- Lepidozia everettii Steph.
- Lepidozia fauriana Steph.
- Lepidozia ferdinandi-muelleri Steph.
- Lepidozia filamentosa (Lehm. & Lindenb.) Gottsche, Lindenb. & Nees
- Lepidozia fistulosa Mitt.
- Lepidozia flexuosa Mitt.
- Lepidozia fuegiensis Steph.
- Lepidozia fugax J.J. Engel
- Lepidozia gedena Steph.
- Lepidozia glaucescens J.J. Engel
- Lepidozia glaucophylla (Hook. f. & Taylor) Gottsche, Lindenb. & Nees
- Lepidozia grandifolia Steph.
- Lepidozia griseola Herzog
- Lepidozia groenlandica Lehm.
- Lepidozia gwamii Piippo
- Lepidozia hampeana Lindenb.
- Lepidozia hasskarliana (Gottsche, Lindenb. & Nees) Steph.
- Lepidozia hastatistipula Steph.
- Lepidozia hexiloba Pearson
- Lepidozia hirta Steph.
- Lepidozia holorhiza (Reinw., Blume & Nees) Nees
- Lepidozia inaequalis (Lehm. & Lindenb.) Lehm. & Lindenb.
- Lepidozia incurvata Lindenb.
- Lepidozia infuscata Mitt.
- Lepidozia integrifolia Doei
- Lepidozia jamaicensis Steph.
- Lepidozia kashyapii D. Singh & D.K. Singh
- Lepidozia kinabaluensis Mizut.
- Lepidozia kirkii Steph.
- Lepidozia lacerifolia Steph.
- Lepidozia laevifolia Hook. f. & Taylor) Gottsche, Lindenb. & Nees
- Lepidozia loheri Steph.
- Lepidozia longifolia Steph.
- Lepidozia loriana Steph.
- Lepidozia macrocolea Spruce
- Lepidozia massartiana Schiffn. ex Steph.
- Lepidozia microphylla (Hook.) Lindenb.
- Lepidozia microstipula Steph.
- Lepidozia minima Steph.
- Lepidozia minor (Gottsche, Lindenb. & Nees) Solari
- Lepidozia miqueliana Sande Lac.
- Lepidozia montana Steph.
- Lepidozia newtonii Steph.
- Lepidozia nova Steph.
- Lepidozia novae-zelandiae Steph.
- Lepidozia obtusiloba Steph.
- Lepidozia omeiensis P.C. Chen ex Mizut. & K.C. Chang
- Lepidozia ornata J.J. Engel
- Lepidozia pallida Steph.
- Lepidozia palmicola Steph.
- Lepidozia parvistipa Taylor
- Lepidozia parvula N. Kitag.
- Lepidozia paschalis Steph.
- Lepidozia patens Lindenb.
- Lepidozia paucifolia Steph.
- Lepidozia paupercula Steph.
- Lepidozia pearsonii Spruce
- Lepidozia pendulina (Hook.) Lindenb.
- Lepidozia pinnaticruris Spruce ex Steph.
- Lepidozia plumula Herzog
- Lepidozia portoricensis Fulford
- Lepidozia procera Mitt.
- Lepidozia pseudocupressina Schiffn.
- Lepidozia pumila J.J. Engel
- Lepidozia quadridens (Nees) Nees
- Lepidozia quadrifida Lindenb.
- Lepidozia reptans (L.) Dumort.
- Lepidozia richardsii Herzog
- Lepidozia rigida Steph.
- Lepidozia robusta Steph.
- Lepidozia rufescens Steph.
- Lepidozia sandvicensis Lindenb.
- Lepidozia schwabei Herzog
- Lepidozia sellingiana H.A. Mill.
- Lepidozia septemfida Steph.
- Lepidozia serpens Spruce
- Lepidozia serrulata J.J. Engel
- Lepidozia setigera Steph.
- Lepidozia sikkimensis Steph.
- Lepidozia spinosissima (Hook. f. & Taylor) Mitt.
- Lepidozia squamifolia Steph.
- Lepidozia squarrosa Steph.
- Lepidozia stahlii Steph.
- Lepidozia stuhlmannii Steph.
- Lepidozia subdichotoma Spruce
- Lepidozia subintegra Lindenb.
- Lepidozia subtransversa Steph.
- Lepidozia subtrichodes Steph.
- Lepidozia succida Mitt.
- Lepidozia supradecomposita Lindenb.
- Lepidozia suyungii C. Gao & X.L. Bai
- Lepidozia terricola Steph.
- Lepidozia triangulifolia Steph.
- Lepidozia trichodes (Reinw., Blume & Nees) Nees
- Lepidozia tricuspidata Steph.
- Lepidozia ubangiensis Steph.
- Lepidozia udarii S.C. Srivast., D. Kumar & D. Sharma
- Lepidozia ulothrix (Schwägr.) Lindenb.
- Lepidozia vitrea Steph.
- Lepidozia wattsiana Steph.
- Lepidozia weymouthiana Steph.
