= Lindenbergia sokotrana =

Conservation status
- Least Concern (IUCN 3.1)

Scientific classification
- Kingdom: Plantae
- Clade: Tracheophytes
- Clade: Angiosperms
- Clade: Eudicots
- Clade: Asterids
- Order: Lamiales
- Family: Orobanchaceae
- Genus: Lindenbergia
- Species: L. sokotrana

Binomial name
- Lindenbergia sokotrana Vierh.

Species of flowering plant in the broomrape family

Lindenbergia sokotrana is a species of plant in the family Orobanchaceae. It is endemic to Socotra.
