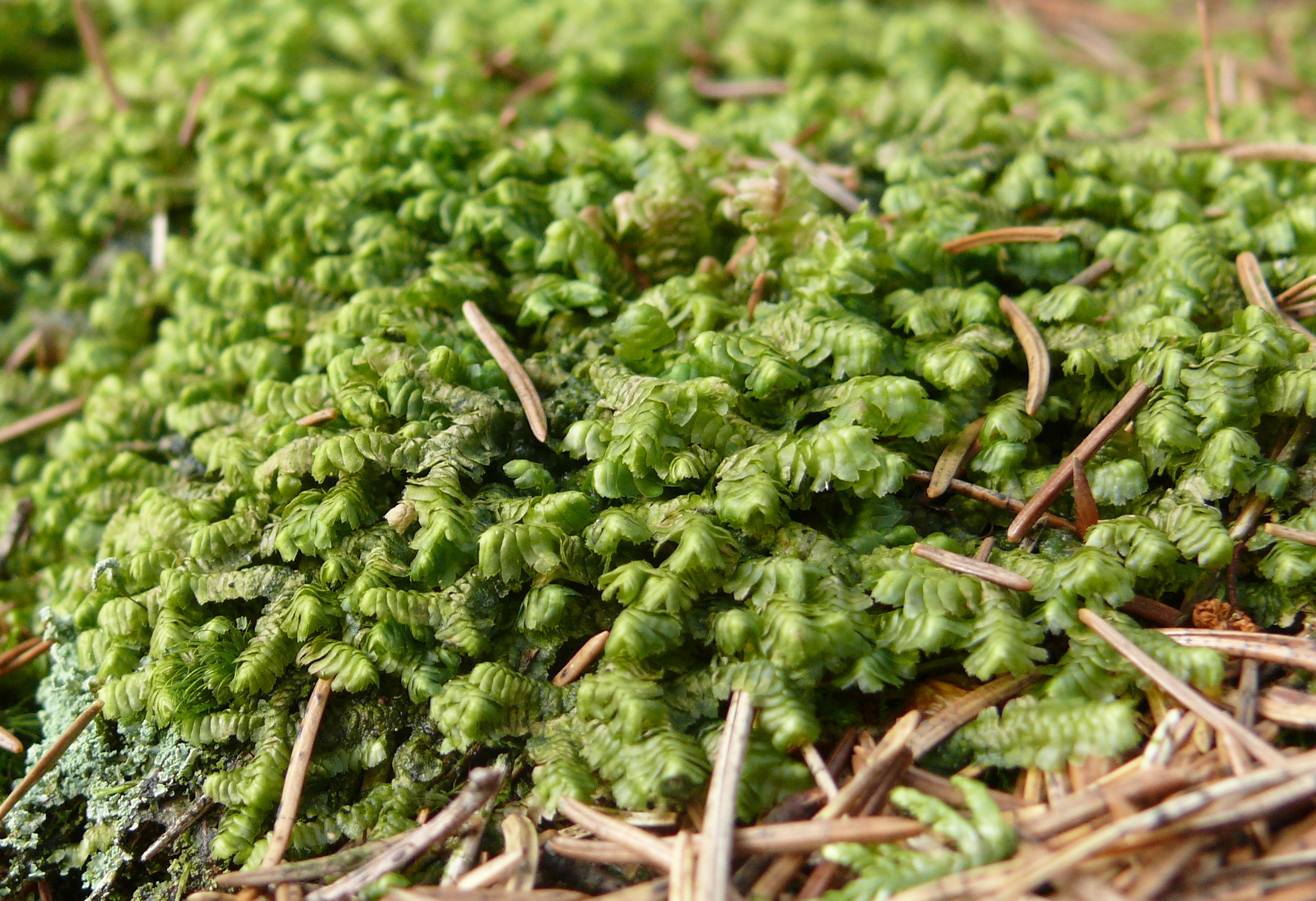
- Bazzania trilobata

Scientific classification
- Kingdom: Plantae
- Division: Marchantiophyta
- Class: Jungermanniopsida
- Order: Lepidoziales
- Family: Lepidoziaceae
- Genus: Bazzania; Gray

Species
- See text

Synonyms
- Campanea Trevis.; Dendrobazzania R.M.Schust. & W.B.Schofield; Herpetium Nees; Mastigopsis Sande Lac. ex Lacout.; Pleuroschisma Dumort.

= Bazzania =

Genus of liverworts

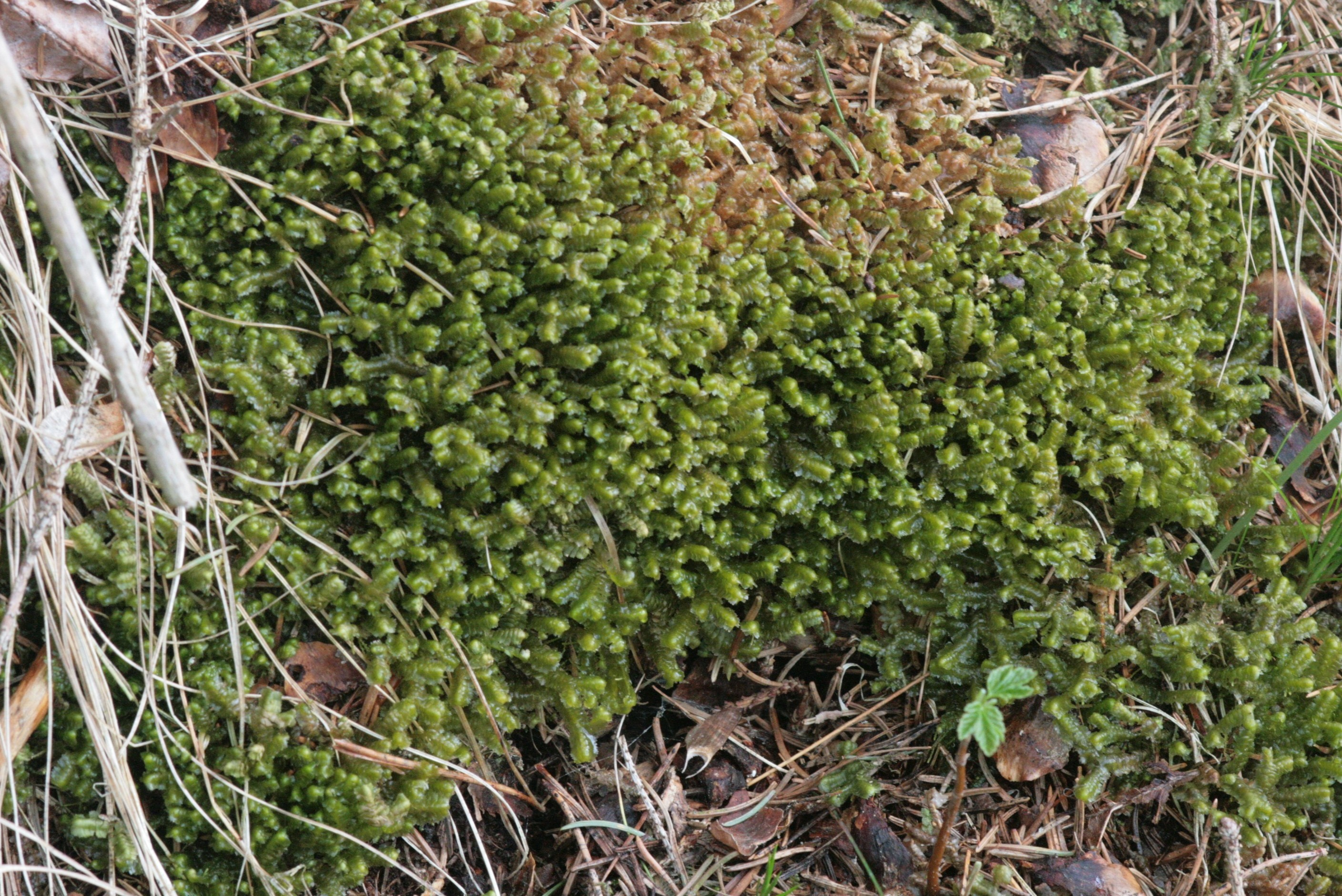
Bazzania trilobata

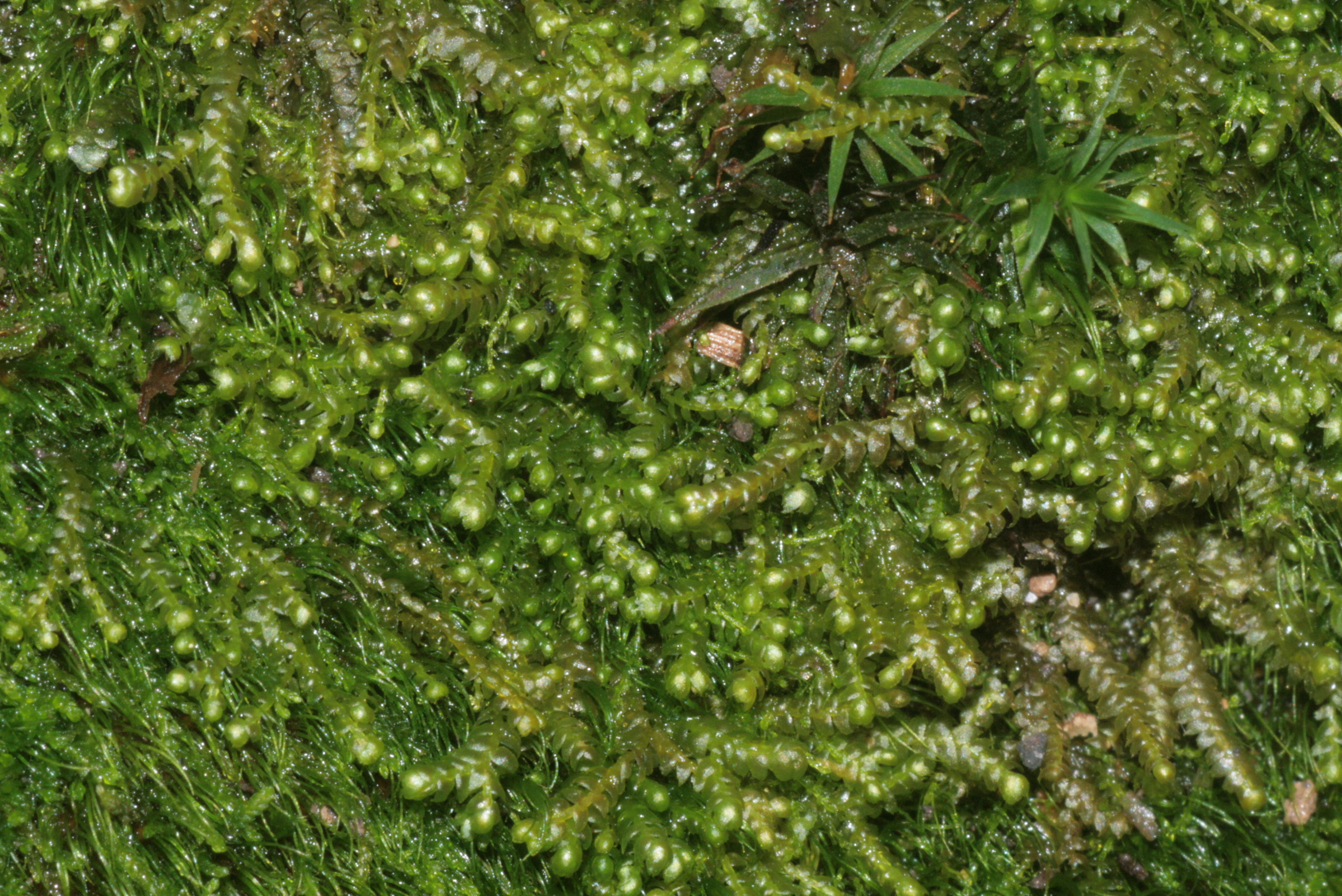
Bazzania flaccida

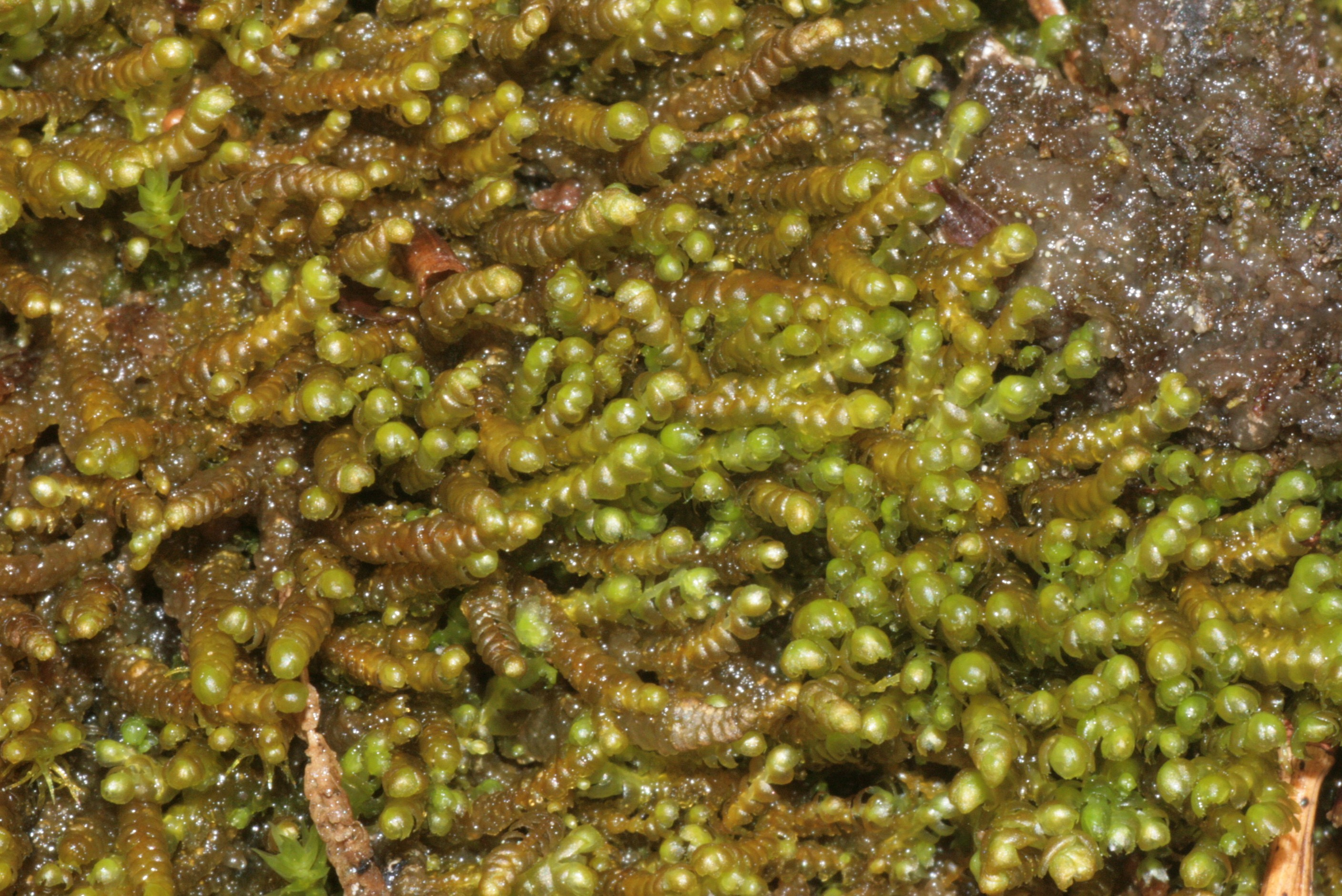
Bazzania tricrenata

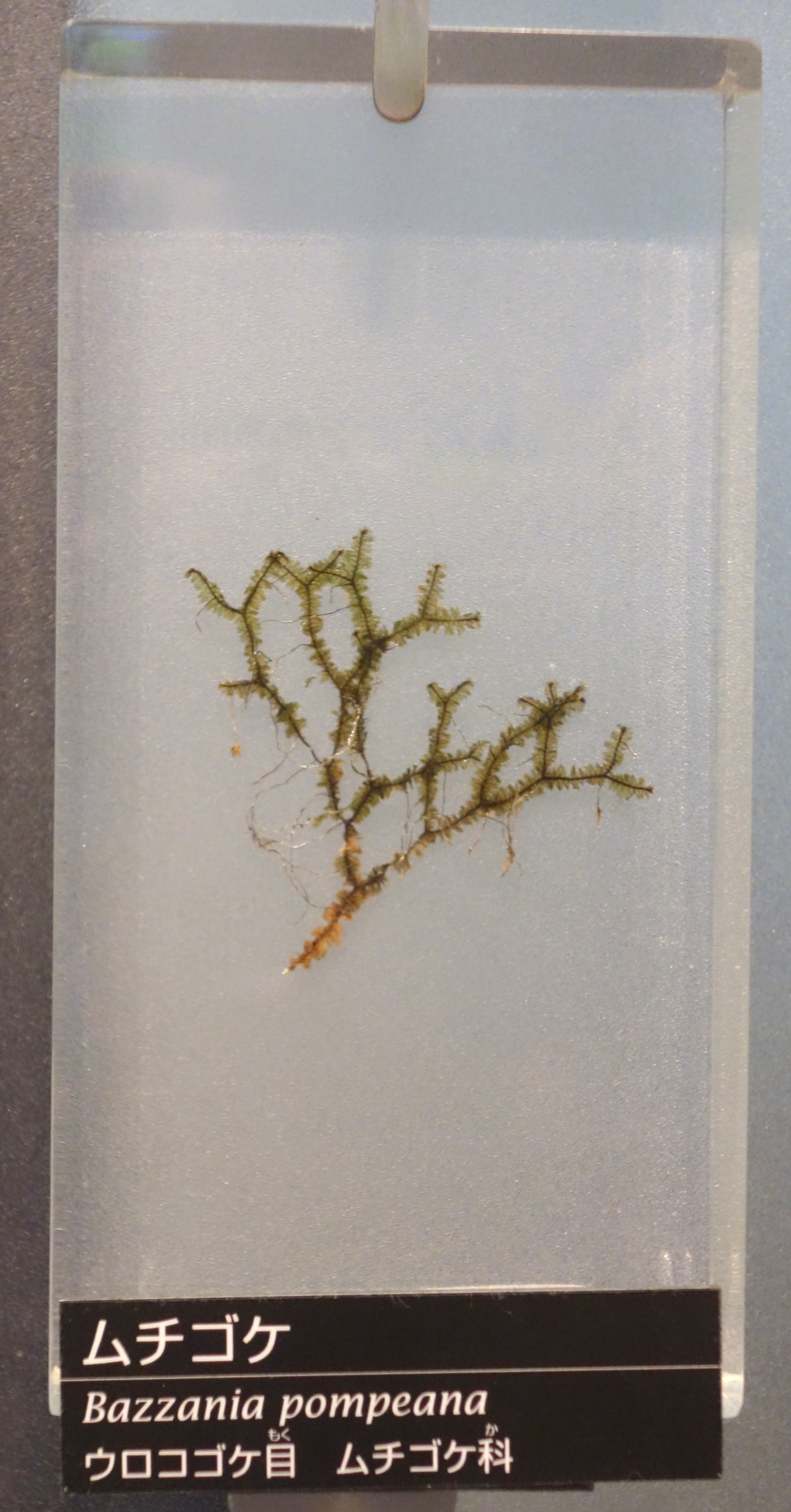
Bazzania pompeana

Bazzania is a genus of liverwort in the family Lepidoziaceae. The name Bazzania is in honour of Matteo Bazzani (1674–1749), an Italian botanist and professor of Anatomy from the University of Bologna.

== Species ==
As of November 2024, there were 258 species accepted by The Bryophyte Nomenclator, edited by John C. Brinda and John J. Atwood, listed here.

- Bazzania acanonista U.Schwarz, Schäf.-Verw. & Shevock
- Bazzania acanoserrata U.Schwarz, Schäf.-Verw. & Shevock
- Bazzania acanthostipa Spruce
- Bazzania accreta (Lehm. & Lindenb.) Trevis.
- Bazzania acinaciformis Steph.
- Bazzania acuminata (Lindenb. & Gottsche) Trevis.
- Bazzania acutifolia (Steph.) Schiffn.
- Bazzania adnexa (Lehm. & Lindenb.) Trevis.
- Bazzania affinis (Lindenb. & Gottsche) Trevis.
- Bazzania albifolia Horik.
- Bazzania amadoi D.P.Costa
- Bazzania ambigua (Lindenb.) Trevis.
- Bazzania amblyphylla Meagher
- Bazzania aneityensis (Steph.) Tixier
- Bazzania angusta (Steph.) Herzog
- Bazzania angustifolia Horik.
- Bazzania angustisedens (Steph.) N.Kitag.
- Bazzania angustistipula N.Kitag.
- Bazzania appendiculata (Mitt.) S.Hatt.
- Bazzania approximata Onr.
- Bazzania armatistipula (Steph.) Fulford
- Bazzania asperrima Steph.
- Bazzania asymmetrica (Steph.) N.Kitag.
- Bazzania aterrima (Steph.) N.Kitag.
- Bazzania aurescens Spruce
- Bazzania avia Meagher
- Bazzania avittata Denny
- Bazzania azorica H.Buch & Perss.
- Bazzania baldwinii Austin ex A.Evans
- Bazzania bernieri (Steph.) Inoue & H.A.Mill.
- Bazzania bescherellei Steph.
- Bazzania bhutanica N.Kitag. & Grolle
- Bazzania bicrenata N.Kitag.
- Bazzania bidens (Gottsche & Lindenb.) Trevis.
- Bazzania bidentula (Steph.) P.Syd.
- Bazzania bilobata N.Kitag.
- Bazzania borneensis N.Kitag.
- Bazzania brasiliensis (Gottsche & Lindenb.) Trevis.
- Bazzania brighamii (Austin) A.Evans
- Bazzania cadens N.Kitag.
- Bazzania calcarata (Sande Lac.) Schiffn.
- Bazzania callida (Sande Lac. ex Steph.) Abeyw.
- Bazzania calypogeoides Bakalin, Maltseva & Klimova
- Bazzania canelensis (Steph.) Fulford
- Bazzania caudata (Steph.) Herzog
- Bazzania caudistipula (Steph.) Inoue & H.A.Mill.
- Bazzania ceylanica (Mitt.) Steph.
- Bazzania chilensis (Steph.) Spruce
- Bazzania chimantensis Fulford
- Bazzania cincinnata (De Not.) Trevis.
- Bazzania citharodes Meagher
- Bazzania combinata (J.B.Jack & Steph.) Steph.
- Bazzania commutata (Lindenb. & Gottsche) Schiffn.
- Bazzania comorensis Steph.
- Bazzania confertifolia (Steph.) Herzog
- Bazzania conistipula (Steph.) H.A.Mill.
- Bazzania conophylla (Sande Lac.) Schiffn.
- Bazzania consociata (Steph.) H.A.Mill.
- Bazzania corbierei (Steph.) Meagher
- Bazzania crassidentata Fulford
- Bazzania crassitexta Steph.
- Bazzania cucullata Onr.
- Bazzania cuneistipula (Gottsche & Lindenb.) Trevis.
- Bazzania debilis N.Kitag.
- Bazzania deciduifolia Onr.
- Bazzania decrescens (Lehm. & Lindenb.) Trevis.
- Bazzania densa (Sande Lac.) Schiffn.
- Bazzania denticulata (Lindenb. & Gottsche) Trevis.
- Bazzania denticulifera Mägd.
- Bazzania denudata (Torr. ex Gottsche, Lindenb. & Nees) Trevis.
- Bazzania deplanchei (Gottsche ex Steph.) Jovet-Ast
- Bazzania desciscens (Steph.) Meijer
- Bazzania didericiana (Gottsche ex Steph.) Steph.
- Bazzania diminuta Herzog
- Bazzania distans (Nees) Trevis.
- Bazzania diversicuspis Spruce
- Bazzania drepanophylla Herzog
- Bazzania dulitensis Herzog
- Bazzania dulongensis L.P.Zhou & Li Zhang
- Bazzania elmeri (Steph.) N.Kitag.
- Bazzania elongata Fulford
- Bazzania emarginata (Steph.) C.M.Cooke
- Bazzania engelii Glenny
- Bazzania erosa (Reinw., Blume & Nees) Trevis.
- Bazzania exempta J.J.Engel
- Bazzania falcata (Lindenb.) Trevis.
- Bazzania fallax (Sande Lac.) Schiffn.
- Bazzania fasciculata (Steph.) Meagher
- Bazzania faurieana (Steph.) S.Hatt.
- Bazzania filiformis Steph.
- Bazzania flaccida (Dumort.) Grolle
- Bazzania flavescens (Sande Lac. ex Steph.) Schiffn.
- Bazzania fleischeri (Steph.) Abeyw.
- Bazzania franciana (Steph.) N.Kitag.
- Bazzania friabilis N.Kitag. & T.Kodama
- Bazzania fuhreri Meagher
- Bazzania fuscescens A.Evans
- Bazzania gamscottii Meagher
- Bazzania gedeana (Steph.) Meijer
- Bazzania globuliformis U.Schwarz, Schäf.-Verw. & Shevock
- Bazzania gracilis (Hampe & Gottsche) Steph.
- Bazzania grandiretis (Steph.) Herzog
- Bazzania griffithiana (Steph.) Mizut.
- Bazzania gunniana (Steph.) H.A.Mill.
- Bazzania hainanensis L.P.Zhou & Li Zhang
- Bazzania halconiensis (Steph.) N.Kitag.
- Bazzania hamatifolia (Steph.) H.A.Mill.
- Bazzania harpago (De Not.) Schiffn.
- Bazzania hebridensis (Steph.) H.A.Mill.
- Bazzania helgana U.Schwarz, Schäf.-Verw. & Shevock
- Bazzania herminieri (Gottsche ex Steph.) Pagán
- Bazzania herzogiana Meijer
- Bazzania himalayana (Mitt.) Schiffn.
- Bazzania hochstetteri (Reichardt) E.A.Hodgs.
- Bazzania horridula Schiffn.
- Bazzania inaequabilis Steph.
- Bazzania inaequitexta Steph.
- Bazzania incrassata (Steph.) N.Kitag.
- Bazzania indica (Gottsche & Lindenb.) Trevis.
- Bazzania indigenarum (Steph.) N.Kitag.
- Bazzania insignis (De Not.) Trevis.
- Bazzania intermedia (Gottsche & Lindenb.) Trevis.
- Bazzania involuta (Mont.) Trevis.
- Bazzania involutiformis (De Not.) Trevis.
- Bazzania irregularis (Steph.) Schiffn.
- Bazzania jamaicensis (Lehm. & Lindenb.) Trevis.
- Bazzania japonica (Sande Lac.) Lindb.
- Bazzania javanica (Sande Lac.) Schiffn.
- Bazzania kernii Steph.
- Bazzania kokawana N.Kitag. & T.Kodama
- Bazzania konratiana Gyarmati
- Bazzania lacouturei (Steph.) Gyarmati
- Bazzania latifolia Steph.
- Bazzania laxifolia (Steph.) Demaret
- Bazzania leratii (Beauverd) H.A.Mill.
- Bazzania lessonii (Steph.) H.A.Mill.
- Bazzania levieri (Steph.) N.Kitag.
- Bazzania linearis Herzog
- Bazzania linguiformis (Sande Lac.) Trevis.
- Bazzania longicaulis (Sande Lac.) Schiffn.
- Bazzania longistipula (Lindenb.) Trevis.
- Bazzania loricata (Reinw., Blume & Nees) Trevis.
- Bazzania lowii (Sande Lac. ex Steph.) Schiffn.
- Bazzania luzonensis (Steph.) Del Ros.
- Bazzania macgregorii Steph.
- Bazzania madagassa (Steph.) Gyarmati & Gradst.
- Bazzania magna Horik.
- Bazzania magnistipula N.Kitag.
- Bazzania malaccensis (Steph.) Tixier
- Bazzania manczurica Bakalin
- Bazzania manillana (Gottsche ex Steph.) S.Hatt.
- Bazzania marginata (Steph.) N.Kitag.
- Bazzania marginella (Herzog) N.Kitag. & T. Kodama
- Bazzania mascarena (Steph.) Herzog
- Bazzania mayebarae S.Hatt.
- Bazzania menzelii E.D.Cooper
- Bazzania merrilliana (Steph.) Inoue ex Bonner
- Bazzania minuta (Austin) A.Evans
- Bazzania minutidens (Steph.) Inoue & H.A.Mill.
- Bazzania minutiserra (Steph.) N.Kitag.
- Bazzania missionum (Herzog) Jovet-Ast
- Bazzania mittenii (Steph.) Steph.
- Bazzania monilinervis (Lehm. & Lindenb.) Trevis.
- Bazzania morokensis (Steph.) Grolle
- Bazzania nitida (F.Weber) Grolle
- Bazzania novae-zelandiae (Mitt.) Besch. & C.Massal.
- Bazzania nudicaulis A.Evans
- Bazzania nuuanuensis C.M.Cooke
- Bazzania obcuneata (Steph.) H.A.Mill.
- Bazzania obtusata (Mitt.) Abeyw.
- Bazzania okaritana Meagher & Glenny
- †Bazzania oleosa Grolle
- Bazzania orbanii Pócs
- Bazzania ovistipula (Steph.) Abeyw.
- Bazzania pallidevirens (Steph.) Fulford
- Bazzania palmatifidoides U.Schwarz, Schäf.-Verw. & Shevock
- Bazzania papillosa S.W.Arnell
- Bazzania parabidentula Bakalin
- Bazzania paradoxa (Sande Lac.) Steph.
- Bazzania parisii (Steph.) N.Kitag.
- Bazzania parvitexta Steph.
- Bazzania patens (Mont.) Trevis.
- Bazzania patentistipa (Sande Lac.) Schiffn.
- Bazzania paucidens (Steph.) H.A.Mill.
- Bazzania pearsonii Steph.
- Bazzania pectinata (Lindenb. & Gottsche) Schiffn.
- Bazzania perfalcata N.Kitag.
- Bazzania perrotiana E.W.Jones
- Bazzania peruviana (Nees) Trevis.
- Bazzania phyllobola Spruce
- Bazzania placophylla (Taylor) Grolle
- Bazzania platycnema (Schwägr. ex Steph.) H.A.Mill.
- Bazzania polita Glenny
- †Bazzania polyodus (Casp.) Grolle
- Bazzania pompeana (Sande Lac.) Mitt.
- Bazzania praerupta (Reinw., Blume & Nees) Trevis.
- Bazzania pseudovittata N.Kitag. & T.Kodama
- Bazzania pusilla (Mitt.) Steph.
- Bazzania pycnophylla (Taylor) Trevis.
- Bazzania quadratistipula H.A.Mill.
- Bazzania rabenhorstii (Steph.) Abeyw.
- Bazzania recurva (Mont.) Trevis.
- Bazzania reflexa (Gottsche) Steph.
- Bazzania reicheliana U.Schwarz, Schäf.-Verw. & Shevock
- Bazzania reinwardtii (Sande Lac.) Schiffn.
- Bazzania renistipula Steph.
- Bazzania revoluta (Steph.) N.Kitag.
- Bazzania rimosa Meagher
- Bazzania roraimensis (Steph.) Fulford
- Bazzania sandvicensis (Gottsche ex Steph.) Steph.
- Bazzania sauropoda Meagher
- Bazzania scalaris Meagher
- Bazzania schultze-motelii N.Kitag.
- Bazzania schusteriana N.Kitag.
- Bazzania schwaneckiana (Hampe & Gottsche) Trevis.
- Bazzania scutigera (Nees & Mont.) Trevis.
- Bazzania serpentina (Nees) Trevis.
- Bazzania serrapiculata Inoue & H.A.Mill.
- Bazzania serrata Fulford
- Bazzania serrulatoides Horik.
- Bazzania siamensis (Steph.) Bakalin & Klimova
- Bazzania sikkimensis Schiffn.
- Bazzania spinosa S.Okamura
- Bazzania spiralis (Reinw., Blume & Nees) Meijer
- Bazzania spruceana Steph.
- Bazzania squarrosa (Steph.) H.A.Mill.
- Bazzania stolonifera (Sw.) Trevis.
- Bazzania stresemannii (Herzog) N.Kitag.
- Bazzania subacuta (Mitt.) Steph.
- Bazzania subaequitexta (Steph.) N.Kitag.
- Bazzania subintegra (Steph.) L.Söderstr. & A.Hagborg
- Bazzania sublonga Fulford
- Bazzania subserrifolia (Beauverd) H.A.Mill.
- Bazzania subserrulata A.Evans
- Bazzania subtilis (Sande Lac.) Trevis.
- Bazzania succulenta N.Kitag.
- Bazzania sumatrana (Sande Lac. ex Steph.) Steph.
- Bazzania sumbavensis (Gottsche ex Steph.) Steph.
- Bazzania tayloriana (Mitt.) Kuntze
- Bazzania temariana (Steph.) H.A.Mill.
- Bazzania tessellata Meagher
- Bazzania tiaoloensis Mizut. & K.C.Chang
- Bazzania tricrenata (Wahlenb.) Lindb.
- Bazzania tridens (Reinw., Blume & Nees) Trevis.
- Bazzania trilobata (L.) Gray
- Bazzania uncigera (Reinw., Blume & Nees) Trevis.
- Bazzania undulata Herzog
- Bazzania vitiana Mitt. ex Steph.
- Bazzania vittata (Gottsche) Trevis.
- Bazzania wallichiana (Lindenb.) Trevis.
- Bazzania watanabei Inoue
- Bazzania wattsiana (Steph.) Meagher
- Bazzania wiltensii (Sande Lac. ex Steph.) Schiffn.
- Bazzania wooroonooran Meagher
- Bazzania wrightii (Gottsche ex Steph.) Steph.
- Bazzania yoshinagana (Steph.) Yasuda
- Bazzania zollingeri (Lindenb.) Trevis.
- Bazzania zonulata Meagher
