= Johann Bernhard Wilhelm Lindenberg =

German bryologist (1781–1851)

- Born: September 18, 1781; Lübeck
- Died: June 6, 1851 (aged 69); Bergedorf
- Education: University of Jena, University of Göttingen
- Known for: Synopsis Hepaticarum, research on liverworts
- Scientific career
- Fields: Bryology, Law
- Author abbrev. (zoology): Lindenb.

Johann Bernhard Wilhelm Lindenberg (18 September 1781 – 6 June 1851) was a German bryologist who worked as a lawyer in Bergedorf (today a borough of Hamburg).

He was a native of Lübeck, and studied law at the Universities of Jena and Göttingen. Lindenberg specialized in research of liverworts, and with Christian Gottfried Daniel Nees von Esenbeck (1776–1858) and Carl Moritz Gottsche (1808–1892) was the author of an important treatise on hepaticology titled Synopsis Hepaticarum (1844–47).

The plant genus Lindenbergia from the family Orobanchaceae is named in his honor.

== General references ==
- Ernst Wunschmann (1883). "Lindenberg, Johann Bernhard Wilhelm" . Allgemeine Deutsche Biographie (in German). Vol. 18. Leipzig: Duncker & Humblot. pp. 688–689.
