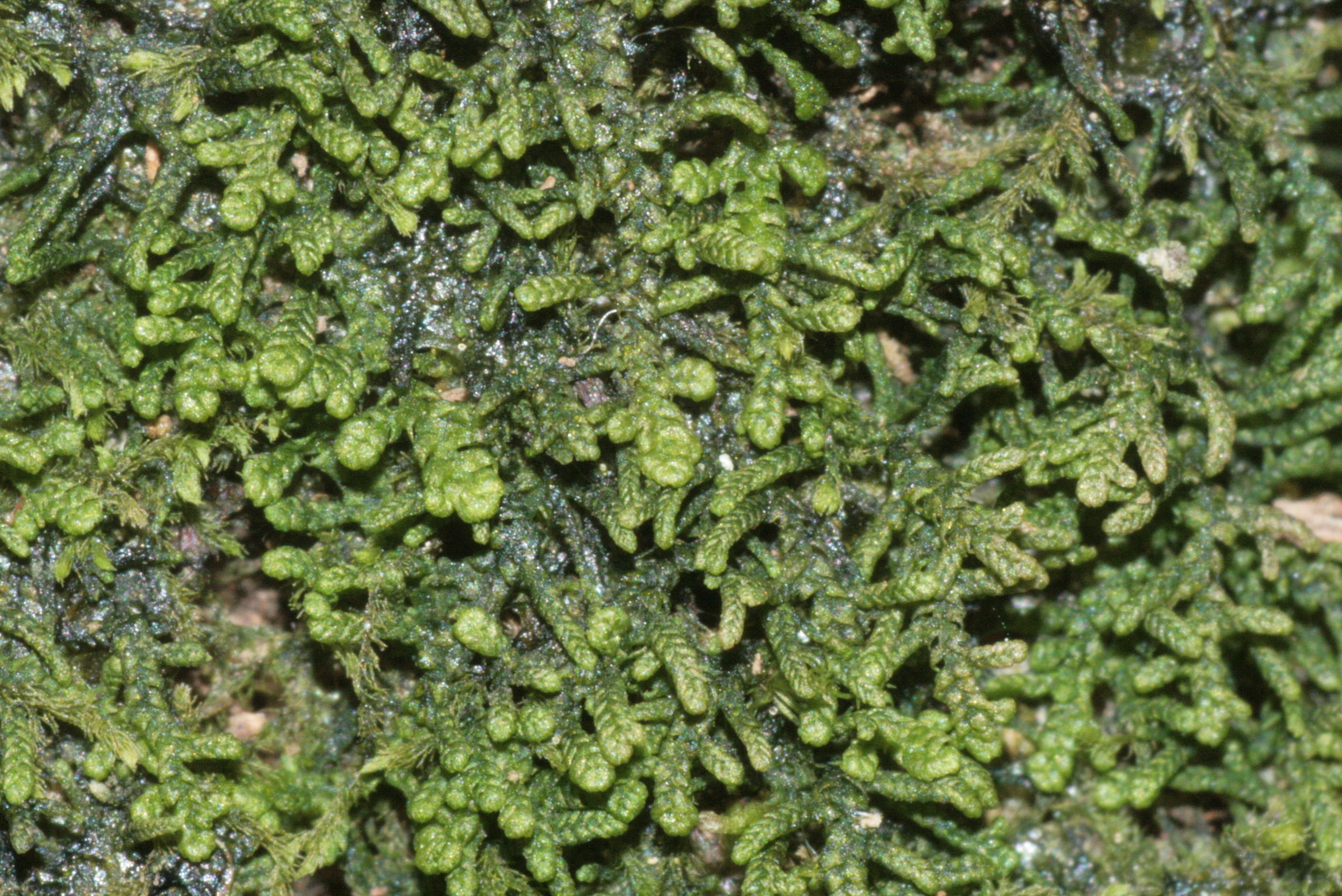
- Lepidozia reptans

Scientific classification
- Kingdom: Plantae
- Division: Marchantiophyta
- Class: Jungermanniopsida
- Order: Lepidoziales
- Family: Lepidoziaceae; Limpr.

Genera
- See text

Synonyms
- List: Bazzaniaceae Nakai; Hyalolepidoziaceae Fulford; Paracromastigaceae Fulford; Regredicaulaceae Fulford; Zoopsidaceae Nakai

= Lepidoziaceae =

Family of liverworts

Lepidoziaceae is a family of leafy liverworts. It is a group of small plants that are widely distributed.

Most of the species of this family are found in tropical regions.

The main characteristics of the family:

1. Oil bodies are small and unsegmented.
2. The leaves are never folded.
3a. In larger species, the leaves are three or four lobed (often dentate) and have an incubous insertion.
3b. In smaller species, the leaves may be divided to their base as filaments.

== Description ==
Species may range from a light to dark green, with some species of Bazzania bluish-green to brown. When the plants branch, the branches do not grow from the underside of the stem.

The leaves are not folded, but are lobed or divided. Species which grow as larger plants have the leaf tips divided in two to three lobes or teeth. Smaller species typically have their leaves divided all the way to the base in two to five thread-like strands of cells. The underleaves vary as well, but typically resemble smaller versions of the lateral leaves.

The rhizoids are few and restricted to the base of the underleaves. Species of Bazzania may have long ventral branches.

== Subfamilies and genera ==
Included subfamilies and genera:

- (not assigned to a subfamily)
  - Mastigobryum (Nees) Nees
  - Meinungeria Frank Müll.
  - Sprucella Steph. 1886,
- Bazzanioideae Rodway
  - Acromastigum A.Evans
  - Bazzania Gray
  - Mastigopelma Mitt.
- Drucelloideae R.M.Schust.
  - Drucella E.A.Hodgs.
- Lembidioideae R.M.Schust.
  - Dendrolembidium Herzog
  - Hygrolembidium R.M.Schust.
  - Isolembidium R.M.Schust.
  - Kurzia G.Martens
  - Lembidium Mitt.
  - Megalembidium R.M.Schust.
  - Pseudocephalozia R.M.Schust.
- Lepidozioideae Müll.Frib.
  - Ceramanus E.D.Cooper
  - Lepidozia (Dumort.) Dumort.
  - Neolepidozia Fulford & J.Taylor
  - Tricholepidozia (R.M.Schust.) E.D.Cooper
- Micropterygioideae Grolle
  - Micropterygium Gottsche
  - Mytilopsis Spruce
- Protocephalozioideae R.M.Schust.
  - Protcephalozia (Spruce) K.I.Goebel
- Zoopsidoideae R.M.Schusts.
  - Amazoopsis J.J.Engel & G.I.Merr.
  - Hyalolepidozia S.W.Arnell ex Grolle
  - Monodactylopsis (R.M.Schust.) R.M.Schust.
  - Neogrollea E.A.Hodgs.
  - Odontoseries Fulford
  - Paracromastigum Fulford & J.Taylor
  - Psiloclada Mitt.
  - Pteropsiella Spruce
  - Telaranea Spruce ex Schiffn.
  - Zoopsidella R.M.Schust.
  - Zoopsis Hook.f. ex Gottsche

== Other sources ==
1. Meagher, David, and David Glenny. “A New Species ofBazzania (Lepidoziaceae) from New Zealand.” Journal of Bryology, vol. 29, no. 1, 2007, pp. 60–63., https://doi.org/10.1179/174328207x175184.
2. Deo, Siddhartha Singh, and D. K. Singh. “Bazzania Bhutanica(Lepidoziaceae, Marchantiophyta) — a Critically Endangered Liverwort Recorded in Indian Bryoflora.” Lindbergia, vol. 2, 2014, pp. 42–46., https://doi.org/10.25227/linbg.01049.
- Grolle, Riclef (1983). "Nomina generica Hepaticarum; references, types and synonymies". Acta Botanica Fennica 121, 1-62.
