= Didymium wildpretii =

Scientific classification
- Domain: Eukaryota
- Clade: Amorphea
- Phylum: Amoebozoa
- Class: Myxogastria
- Order: Physarales
- Family: Didymiaceae
- Genus: Didymium
- Species: D. wildpretii

Binomial name
- Didymium wildpretii Mosquera, Estrada, Beltrán-Tej., D. Wrigley & Lado

Species of slime mould

Didymium wildpretii is a species of slime mold which feeds on the decaying remains of various species of cacti. It was first described in 2007 and has been found across Mexico and the Canary Islands, but may be present where other cacti grow. Its sporocarps are short (0.1–0.7 mm tall); their sporotheca is pale yellow with an orange stalk and their spores have a diameter of 7.5 μm. When grown on agar, it completes its life cycle in 28–56 days. It grows on basic media with a pH of 7.8–10.0, with optimum growth occurring at 8.5–9.4. The species was named after Wolfredo Wildpret de la Torre, an expert in the flora of the Canary Islands.

== Hosts ==
Didymium wildpretii is known to grow on species of the globose cacti Echinocactus platyacanthus, Mammillaria carnea and Ferocactus latispinus; the opuntioid cacti Opuntia depressa, O. maxima, O. pilifera and O. tomentosa) and the columnar cacti (Myrtillocactus geometrizans, Pachycereus hollianus, P. weberi, Stenocereus and Neobuxbaumia.
