= Diderma stellulum =

Scientific classification
- Domain: Eukaryota
- Clade: Amorphea
- Phylum: Amoebozoa
- Class: Myxogastria
- Order: Physarales
- Family: Didymiaceae
- Genus: Diderma
- Species: D. stellulum

Binomial name
- Diderma stellulum M.L. Farr

Species of slime mould

Diderma stellulum is a species of slime mould in the family Didymiaceae, first described by Marie Leonore Farr in 1988. It is found in Brazil, in tropical semideciduous forest.
