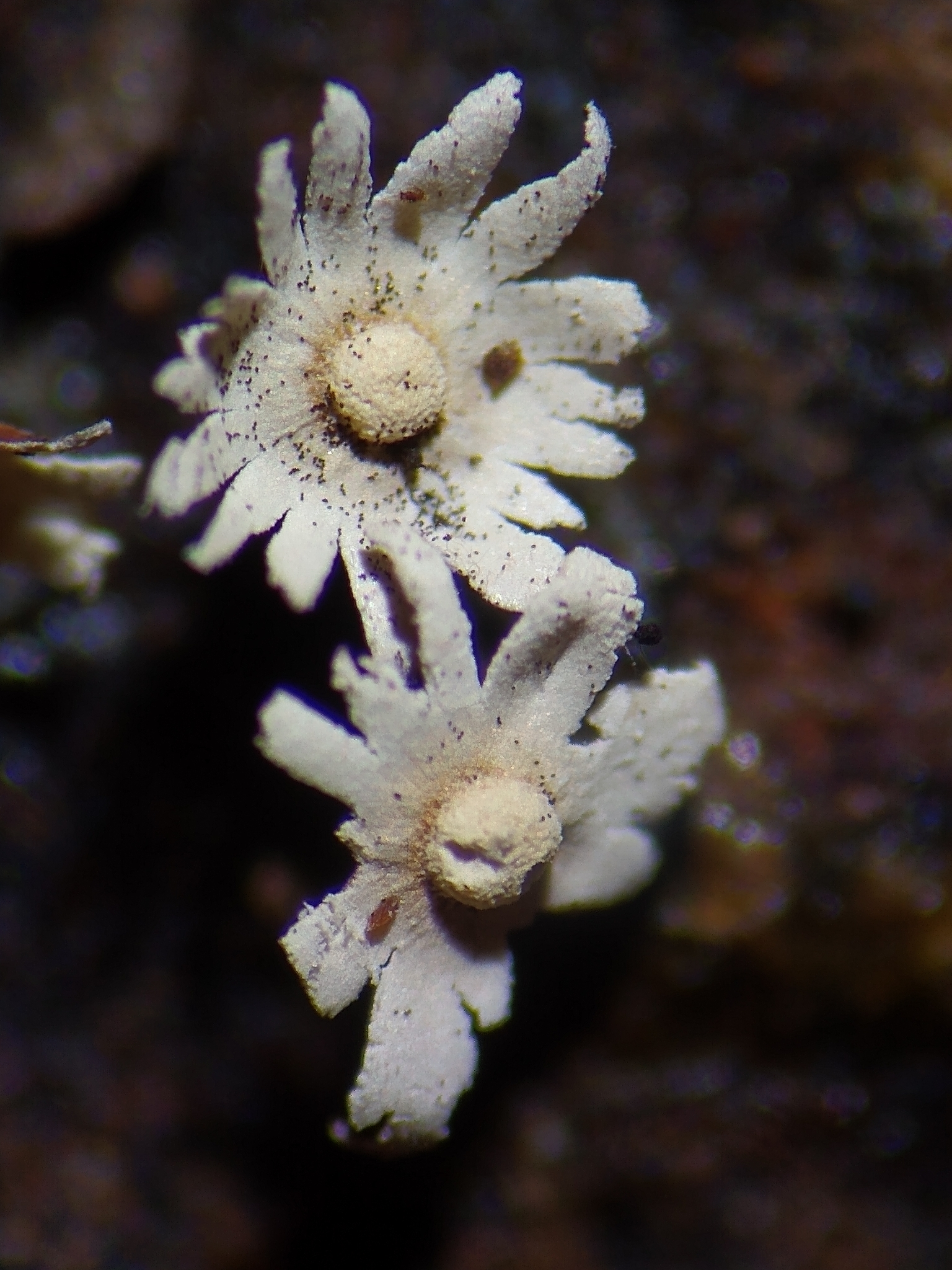

Scientific classification
- Domain: Eukaryota
- Clade: Amorphea
- Phylum: Amoebozoa
- Class: Myxogastria
- Order: Physarales
- Family: Didymiaceae
- Genus: Diderma
- Species: D. subasteroides

Binomial name
- Diderma subasteroides M.L. Farr

= Diderma subasteroides =

Species of slime mould

Diderma subasteroide is a species of slime mould in the family Didymiaceae, first described by Marie Leonore Farr in 1971. It has been found in Africa, South America and Australia.
