= Collaria elegans =

Scientific classification
- Domain: Eukaryota
- Phylum: Amoebozoa
- Class: Myxogastria
- Order: Physarales
- Family: Lamprodermataceae
- Genus: Collaria
- Species: C. elegans

Binomial name
- Collaria elegans (Racib.) Dhillon & Nann.-Bremek. ex Ing, 1982

Subspecies
- Collaria elegans var. elegans (Racib.) Dhillon & Nann.-Bremek. 1977; Collaria elegans var. pallens (G. Lister) Dhillon & Nann. -Bremek. ex Nann. -Bremek. 1983

Synonyms
- Collaria elegans (Racib.) Dhillon & Nann.-Bremek., 1977; Comatricha elegans (Racib.) Lister 1909; Paradiacheopsis elegans (Racib.) Hertel 1956; Raciborskia elegans (Racib.) Berl. 1888; Rostafinskia elegans Racib. 1884

Species of slime mould

Collaria elegans is a species of slime mold in the family Lamprodermataceae.
