= Didymium difforme =

Scientific classification
- Domain: Eukaryota
- Clade: Amorphea
- Phylum: Amoebozoa
- Class: Myxogastria
- Order: Physarales
- Family: Didymiaceae
- Genus: Didymium
- Species: D. difforme

Binomial name
- Didymium difforme (Pers.) Gray, 1821

Species of slime mould

Didymium difforme is a species of slime mold belonging to the family Didymiidae.
