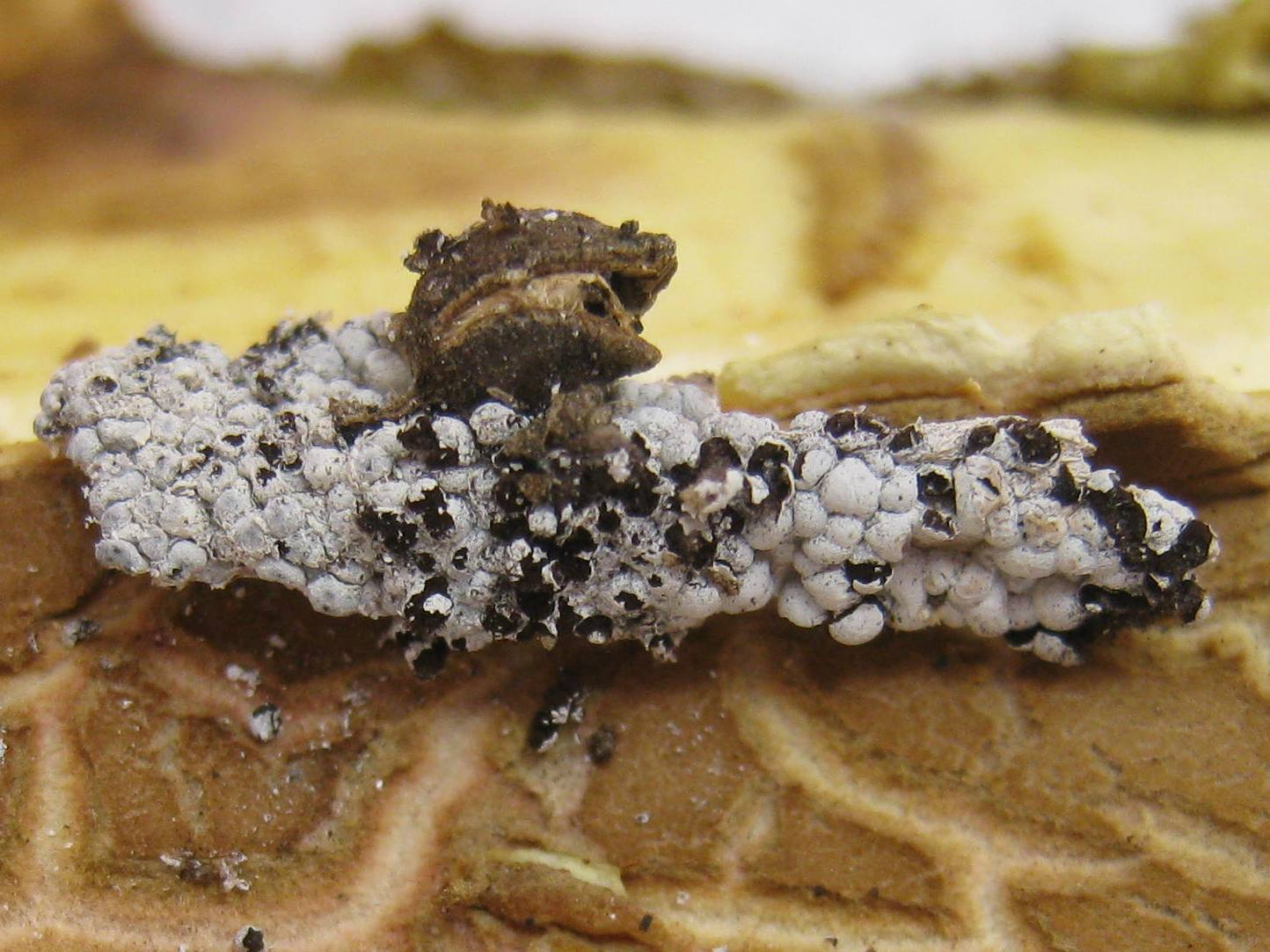

Scientific classification
- Domain: Eukaryota
- Clade: Amorphea
- Phylum: Amoebozoa
- Class: Myxogastria
- Order: Physarales
- Family: Didymiaceae
- Genus: Diderma
- Species: D. cinereum

Binomial name
- Diderma cinereum Morgan

= Diderma cinereum =

Species of slime mould

Diderma cinereum is a species of slime mould in the family Didymiaceae, first described by Andrew Price Morgan in 1894, from specimen(s) found in the Miami Valley on old wood and leaves.

== Description ==
Morgan describes it:

"Sporangia subglobose, more or less irregular, somewhat depressed, sessile, usually close or crowded, sometimes confluent; the hypothallus a thin membrane, pellucid or with occasional patches of lime granules, sometimes not apparent. The wall very thin, even or rugulose, cinereous, the thin membrane covered by a single layer of closely-adherent granules of lime, rupturing irregularly. Columella white, hemispheric or depressed and irregular, the surface granulose. Capillitium of very slender, colored threads, the extremities pellucid, more or less branched. Spores globose, minutely warted, violaceous, 9–11 mm. in diameter. Plate XII, Fig. 46.
Growing on old wood, leaves, etc. The sporangium .3-. 5 mm. in diameter, thin and smooth or rugulose. The species superficially greatly resembles Physarum cinereum."
