= Diderma globosum =

Scientific classification
- Domain: Eukaryota
- Clade: Amorphea
- Phylum: Amoebozoa
- Class: Myxogastria
- Order: Physarales
- Family: Didymiaceae
- Genus: Diderma
- Species: D. globosum

Binomial name
- Diderma globosum Pers.

Species of slime mould

Diderma globosum is a species of slime mould in the family Didymiaceae, first described by Christiaan Hendrik Persoon in 1794.
