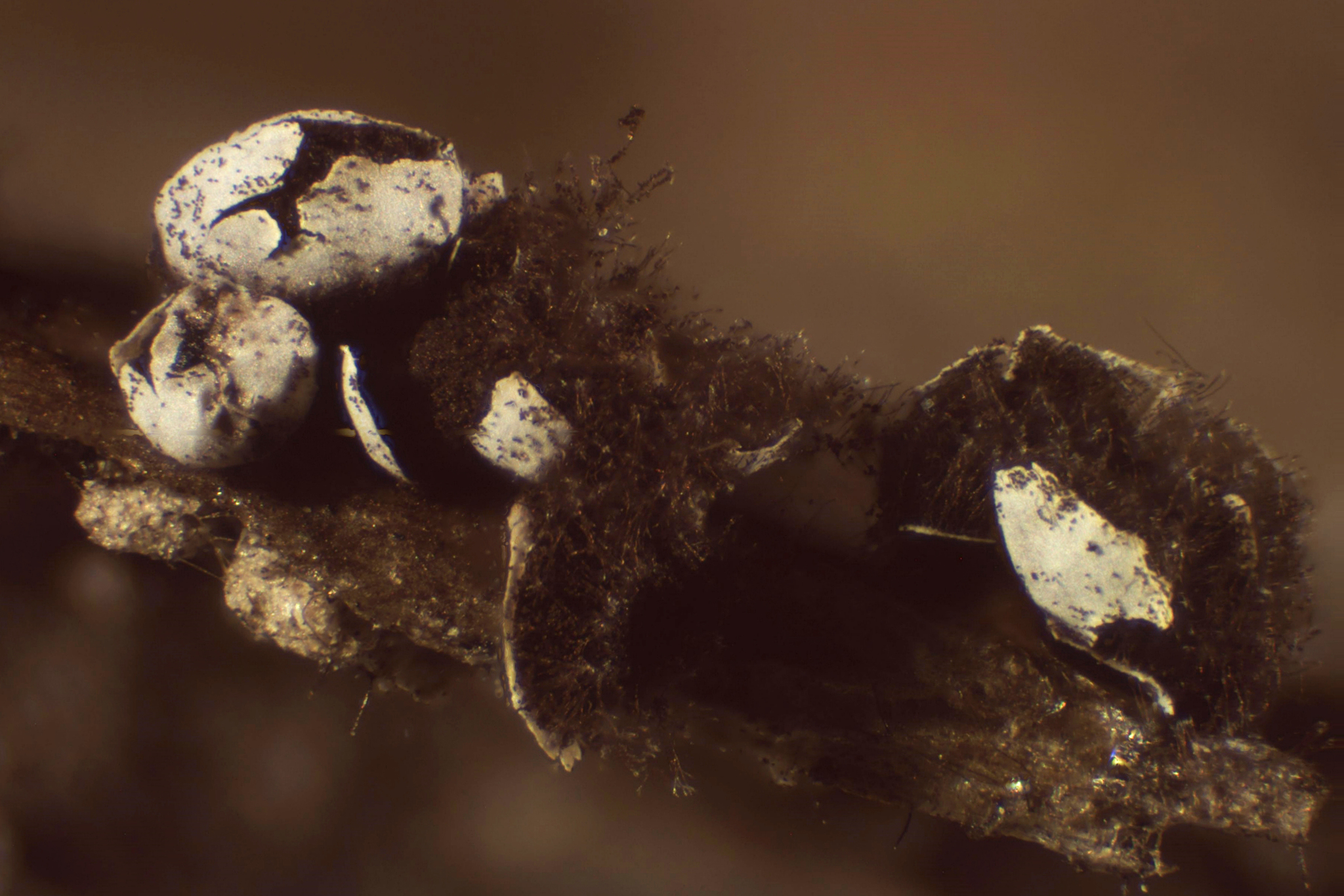
- Diderma umbilicatum

Scientific classification
- Domain: Eukaryota
- Clade: Amorphea
- Phylum: Amoebozoa
- Class: Myxogastria
- Order: Physarales
- Family: Didymiaceae
- Genus: Diderma; Pers.

Type species
- Diderma globosum Pers.

= Diderma =

Genus of slime moulds

Diderma is a genus of slime molds in the family Didymiaceae. The genus was first described by Christiaan Hendrik Persoon in 1794, and the type species is Diderma globosum.

The genus contains over 200 taxa, and includes:

- Diderma stellulum
- Diderma subasteroides
- Diderma cinereum
- Diderma effusum
- Diderma floriforme
- Diderma globosum
- Diderma testaceum
- Diderma umbilicatum
