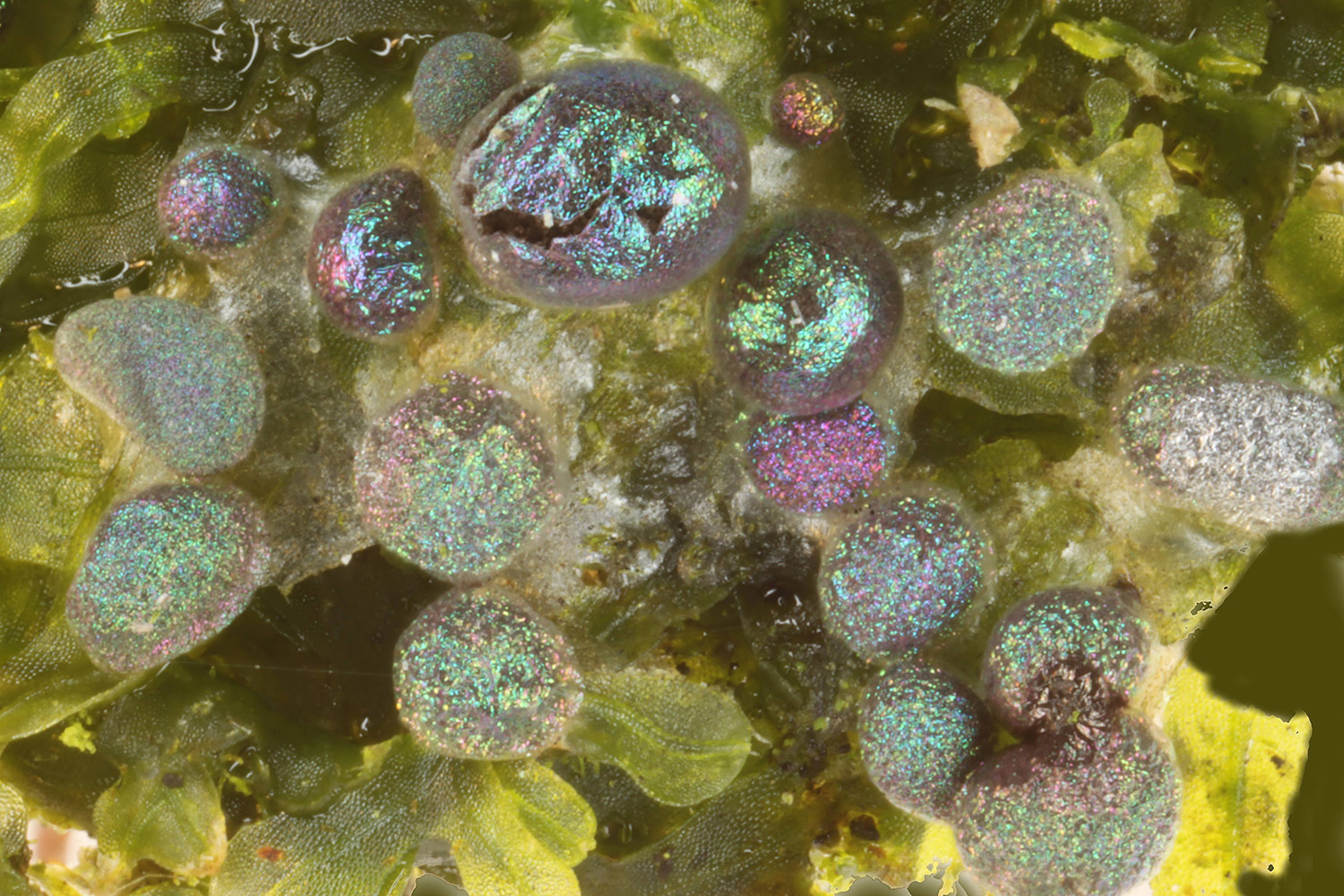
- Diacheopsis synspora

Scientific classification
- Domain: Eukaryota
- Clade: Amorphea
- Phylum: Amoebozoa
- Class: Myxogastria
- Order: Physarales
- Family: Lamprodermataceae
- Genus: Diacheopsis; Meyl., 1930

Type species
- Diacheopsis metallica Meyl., 1930

= Diacheopsis =

Genus of slime moulds

Diacheopsis is a genus of slime molds in the family Lamprodermataceae. As of June 2015, there are 16 species in the genus.

== Species ==
- Diacheopsis depressa
- Diacheopsis effusa
- Diacheopsis insessa
- Diacheopsis kowalskii
- Diacheopsis laxifila
- Diacheopsis metallica
- Diacheopsis minuta
- Diacheopsis mitchellii
- Diacheopsis nannengae
- Diacheopsis pauxilla
- Diacheopsis pieninica
- Diacheopsis reticulospora
- Diacheopsis rigidifila
- Diacheopsis serpula
- Diacheopsis synspora
- Diacheopsis vermicularis
