= Collaria (slime mold) =

Scientific classification
- Domain: Eukaryota
- Clade: Amorphea
- Phylum: Amoebozoa
- Class: Myxogastria
- Order: Physarales
- Family: Lamprodermataceae
- Genus: Collaria; Nann.-Bremek., 1967

Type species
- Collaria rubens (Lister) Nann.-Bremek., 1975

Species
- Collaria arcyrionema (Rostaf.) Nann.-Bremek. 1967; Collaria biasperospora (Kowalski) Dhillon & Nann.-Bremek. ex Ing 1982; Collaria chionophila Lado 1992; Collaria elegans (Racib.) Dhillon & Nann.-Bremek. 1977; Collaria lurida (Lister) Nann.-Bremek. 1967; Collaria nigricapillitia (Nann.-Bremek. & Bozonnet) Lado 2001; Collaria retispora Dhillon & Nann.-Bremek. 1977; Collaria rubens (Lister) Nann.-Bremek. 1975

Genus of slime molds

Collaria is a genus of slime molds in the family Lamprodermataceae.
