= Physarum aeneum =

Scientific classification
- Domain: Eukaryota
- Clade: Amorphea
- Phylum: Amoebozoa
- Class: Myxogastria
- Order: Physarales
- Family: Physaraceae
- Genus: Physarum
- Species: P. aeneum

Binomial name
- Physarum aeneum (Lister) R.E. Fr.

Species of slime mould

Physarum aeneum is a slime mould species from the order Physarida. It is one of a few slime moulds mainly common in the tropics and subtropics.

== Characteristics ==
The plasmodium of Physarum aeneum is black. The plasmodiocarps' fruit bodies are mostly expanded over several centimetres and amasses in groups, which can be produced simple, branched or cancellate. They are pink to brown, light olive, grey or bronze-coloured, and have a shiny or iridescent surface and a diameter from 0.3 to 0.4 mm. The plasmodiocarps are first often surrounded by unstiped, nearly round sporangia.

The membranous hypothallus is barely larger than the plasmodiocarp and dark brown to darkish. The peridium is double-layered: the outer layer, which occasionally features lime tubercles, is rough, gristly, wrinkled and shiny to faint, and the membranous inner layer is iridescent.

The reticular, dense capillitium is composed of transparent strands, which connect the small, rotund to angular, light yellow to medium brown, occasionally whitish-coloured lime tubercles. The spores are in diameter 7 to 9 (rarely 6 to 10) μm and are nearly smooth to finely spiky and in the mass brown, individually pale purple or purple brown in transmitted light, occasionally groups of bigger, darker warts are found on them.

== Habitat ==
Physarum aeneum is native in North America, on the West Indies and in South America. A single find exists in Taiwan. The species populates deadwood and leaf. On pile of light brown leaves they often produce larger colonies of conspicuous, dark brown meshworks.

== Classification ==
The holotype was collected in 1896 or 1897 on Dominika on palm leaves, first described as a variety of Physarum murinum in 1898 by Arthur Lister and grouped into a separate species in 1903 by Robert Elias Fries.
