= Lepidoderma =

Lepidoderma may refer to:

- Adelophthalmus, a genus of prehistoric eurypterids of which Lepidoderma is a synonym
- Lepidoderma (slime mold), a genus of myxomycete
