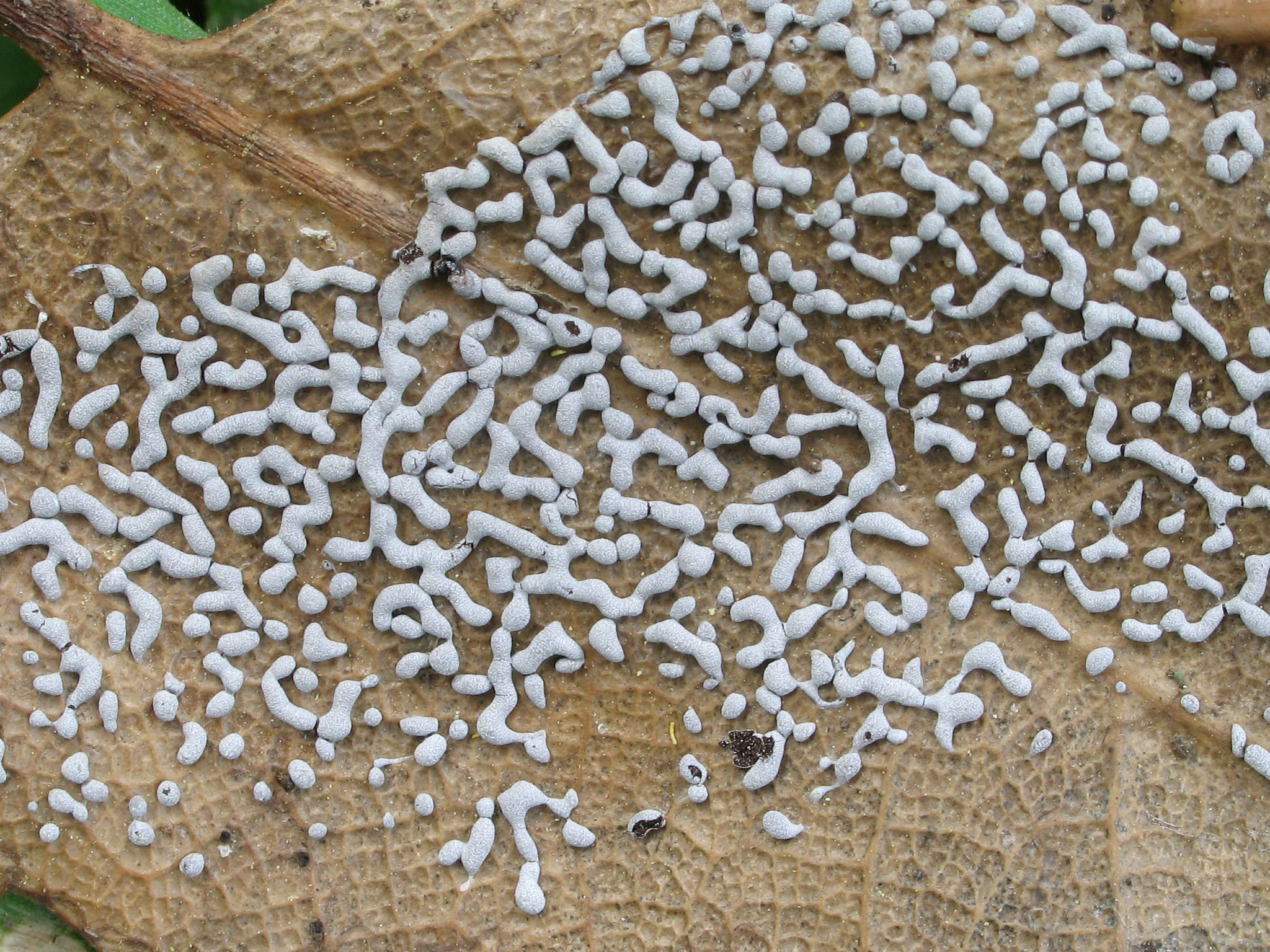

Scientific classification
- Domain: Eukaryota
- Clade: Amorphea
- Phylum: Amoebozoa
- Class: Myxogastria
- Order: Physarales
- Family: Didymiaceae
- Genus: Diderma
- Species: D. effusum

Binomial name
- Diderma effusum (Schwein.) Morgan, 1832

= Diderma effusum =

Species of slime mould

Diderma effusum is a species of slime mould in the family Didymiaceae, first described by Lewis David de Schweinitz in 1832 as Physarum effusum, and transferred to the genus, Diderma, in 1894 by Andrew Price Morgan. It is found throughout the world, It feeds on nonliving organic matter.

== Description ==
Andrew Price Morgan describes it thus:

Plasmodiocarp very much flattened, longitudinally creeping and reticulate or altogether widely effused; hypothallus none. The wall very thin, smooth, white or cinereous, the thin membrane covered by a single layer of closely-adherent granules of lime, rupturing irregularly. The columella reduced to a thin alutaceous layer of granules of lime, forming the base of the plasmodiocarp. Capillitium of short colorless threads, extending from base to layer of the wall, the extremities branched and connected together. Spores globose, even, pale violaceous, 8–10 mic. in diameter. Plate XII. Fig. 48.
Growing on old leaves. The plasmodiocarp forms very much flattened irregular patches from a few to several millimeters in length or extent. I am indebted to Dr. Geo. A. Rex, of Philadelphia, for the identification of my specimens, with those in the herbarium of Schweinitz, under the name of Physarum effusum.
