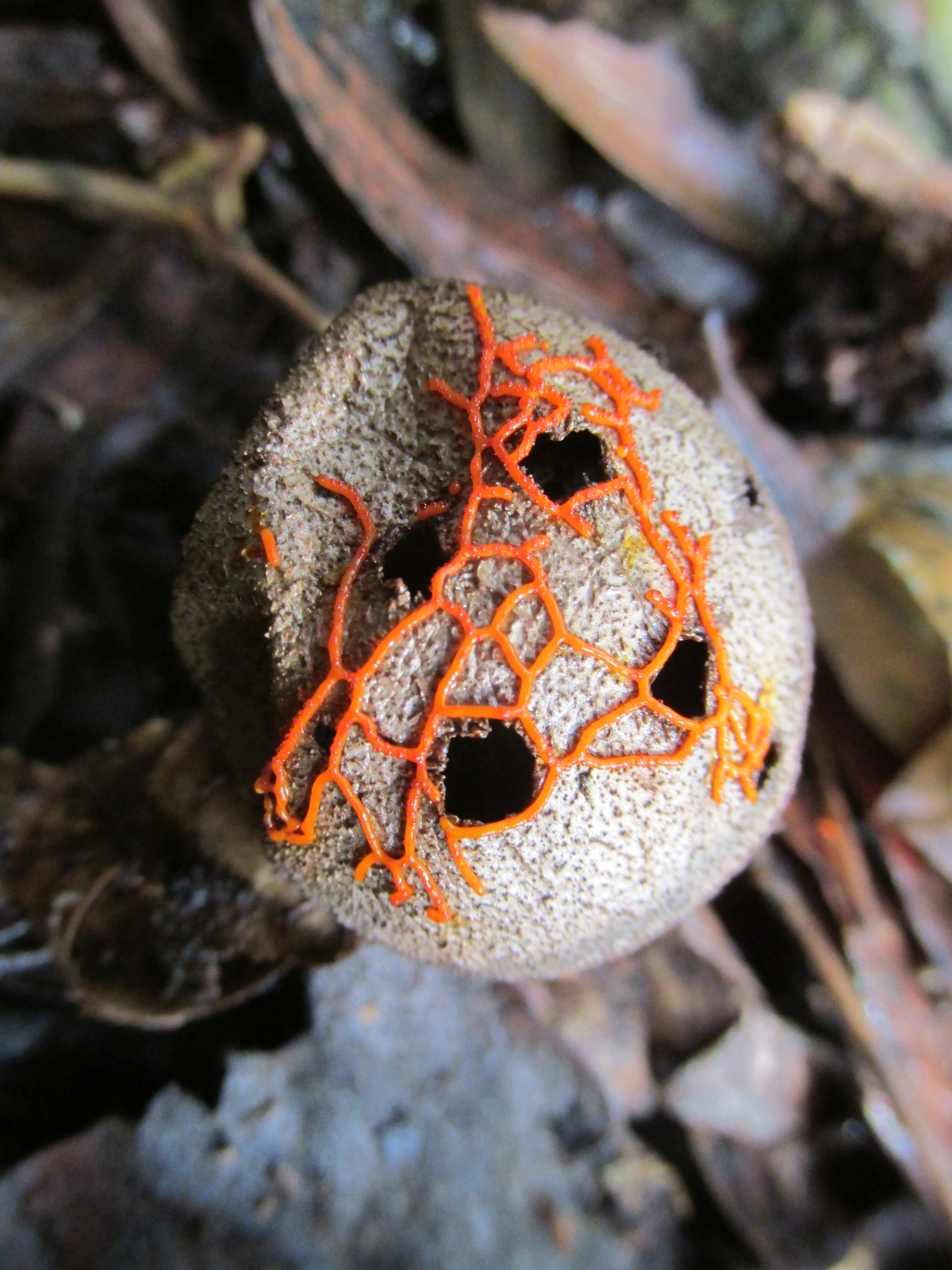

Scientific classification
- Domain: Eukaryota
- Clade: Amorphea
- Phylum: Amoebozoa
- Class: Myxogastria
- Order: Physarales
- Family: Physaraceae
- Genus: Willkommlangea; Kuntze
- Species: W. reticulata

Binomial name
- Willkommlangea reticulata (Alb. & Schwein.) Kuntze

= Willkommlangea =

Genus of slime moulds

Willkommlangea reticulata is a slime mold species from the order Physarales and the only species of the genus Willkommlangea. It is common worldwide, but rare in Europe. The tropics are possibly the main area of habitat.

== Characteristics ==
The plasmodium is orange to scarlet. The fruit bodies are mainly plasmodiocarps, which are worm to net-shaped, beige, ochre or yellow to red-brown coloured and red spotted. The strands are occasionally so closely bound together that they produce pseudo-aethaliae, rarely cushion-form fruit bodies, which have a diameter from 0.3 to 0.5 mm (0.012 to 0.020 in) and expand over several centimetres wide. The hypothallus is inconspicuous or is missing.

The sturdy, crossways puckered peridium is macroscopic light ochre to dark red-brown, in transmitted light yellowish to red-brown and covered with whitish or yellow to red-brown chalk, which occasionally produce a consistent crust. It opens irregularly lengthways, the edge, however, continues to permanently stick with the substrate.

The capillitium comprises a few rotund chalk knots, which are linked through transparent to yellowish strings with acanthoid, non-overgrown humps. The capillitium becomes segmented through white to yellowish, partly perforated limestone plates, which are overgrown on the edge of the peridium. The spores are 8 to 10, rarely 7 to 11 μm and their body is black-brown, in transmitted light purple-brown, on the surface dense and fine-warty.

== Habitat ==
Willkommlangea reticulata are distributed worldwide. It was only occasionally found in Europe. It is believed that the species focuses in the tropics.

== Taxonomy ==
The species was initially known in 1805 as Physarum reticulatum and first named by Johannes Baptista von Albertini and Lewis David von Schweinitz. In 1891 Carl Ernst Otto Kuntze created for it a separate genus, Willkommlangea.

The genus name of Willkommlangea is in honour of both; Heinrich Moritz Willkomm (1821-1895), who was a German academic and botanist and also Johan Martin Christian Lange (1818-1898), who was a prominent Danish born botanist.
