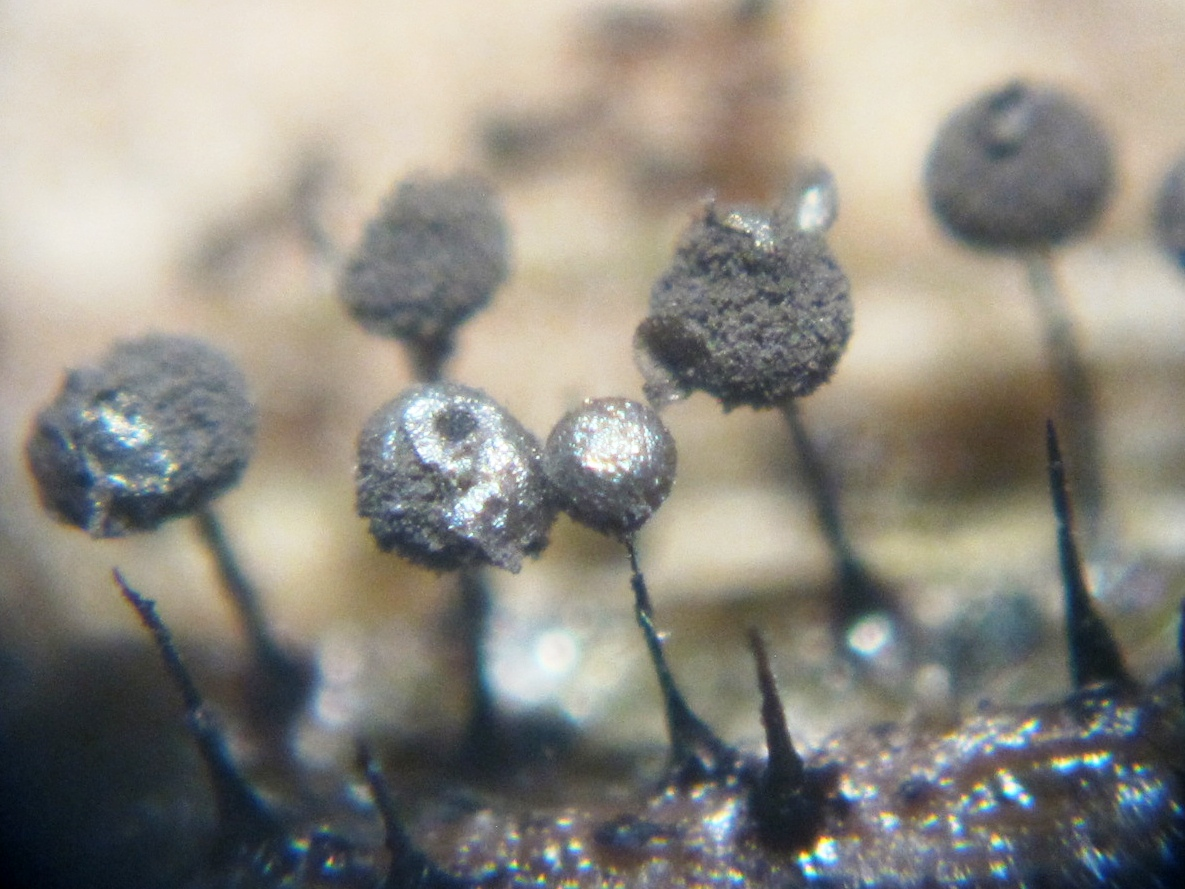
- Lamproderma echinulatum

Scientific classification
- Domain: Eukaryota
- Clade: Amorphea
- Phylum: Amoebozoa
- Class: Myxogastria
- Order: Physarales
- Family: Lamprodermataceae
- Genus: Lamproderma; Rostaf., 1873

Type species
- Lamproderma columbinum (Pers.) Rostaf., 1873

= Lamproderma =

Genus of slime moulds

Lamproderma is a genus of slime molds in the family Lamprodermataceae. As of 2015, there are 46 species in the genus.

== Species ==
- Lamproderma acanthosporum
- Lamproderma aeneum
- Lamproderma alexopouli
- Lamproderma anglicum
- Lamproderma arcyrioides
- Lamproderma argenteobrunneum
- Lamproderma cacographicum
- Lamproderma collinsii
- Lamproderma columbinum
- Lamproderma cristatum
- Lamproderma cucumer
- Lamproderma debile
- Lamproderma disseminatum
- Lamproderma echinosporum
- Lamproderma echinulatum
- Lamproderma elasticum
- Lamproderma granulosum
- Lamproderma griseum
- Lamproderma gulielmae
- Lamproderma hieroglyphicum
- Lamproderma kowalskii
- Lamproderma latifilum
- Lamproderma laxum
- Lamproderma lycopodiicola
- Lamproderma maculatum
- Lamproderma magniretisporum
- Lamproderma meyerianum
- Lamproderma mucronatum
- Lamproderma muscorum
- Lamproderma nordica
- Lamproderma ovoideoechinulatum
- Lamproderma ovoideum
- Lamproderma piriforme
- Lamproderma pseudomaculatum
- Lamproderma pulchellum
- Lamproderma pulveratum
- Lamproderma puncticulatum
- Lamproderma retirugisporum
- Lamproderma sauteri
- Lamproderma scintillans
- Lamproderma spinulosporum
- Lamproderma splendens
- Lamproderma thindianum
- Lamproderma tuberculosporum
- Lamproderma verrucosum
- Lamproderma zonatum
