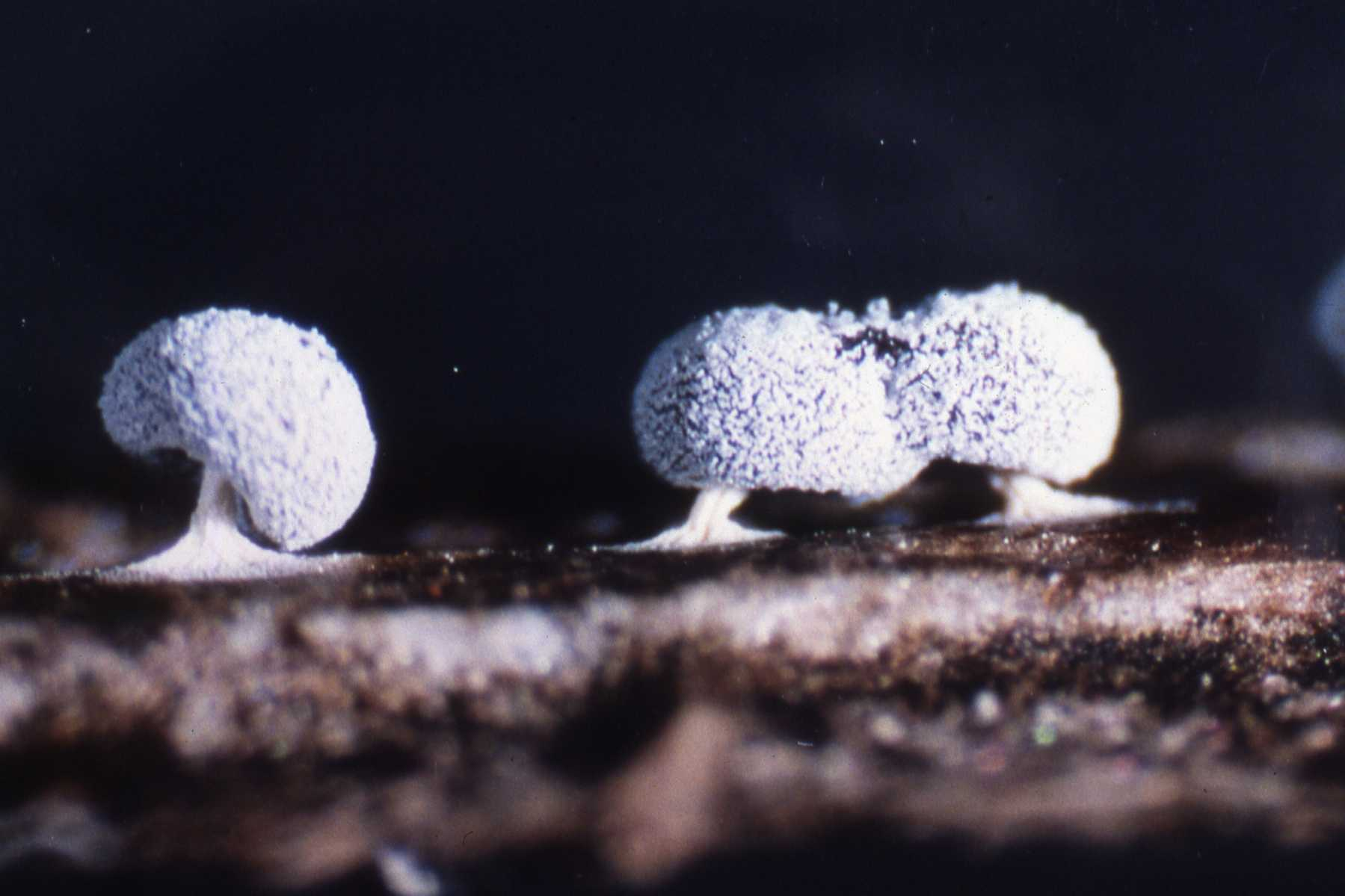
- Didymium squamulosum

Scientific classification
- Domain: Eukaryota
- Supergroup: Amorphea
- Phylum: Amoebozoa
- Class: Myxogastria
- Order: Physarales
- Family: Didymiaceae
- Genus: Didymium; Schrad.

= Didymium (slime mold) =

Genus of slime molds

Didymium is a genus of slime molds in the family Didymiaceae.

== Selected species ==
- Didymium aquatilis
- Didymium difforme
- Didymium spongiosum
- Didymium squamulosum
- Didymium wildpretii
- Didymium kynansum
