= Colloderma =

Scientific classification
- Domain: Eukaryota
- Clade: Amorphea
- Phylum: Amoebozoa
- Class: Myxogastria
- Order: Physarales
- Family: Lamprodermataceae
- Genus: Colloderma; G.Lister, 1910

Type species
- Colloderma oculatum (C.Lippert) G.Lister, 1910

Species
- Colloderma crassipes Colloderma macrotubulatum Colloderma oculatum Colloderma robustum

Genus of slime moulds

Colloderma is a genus of slime molds in the family Lamprodermataceae. As of 2015, there are four species in the genus.
