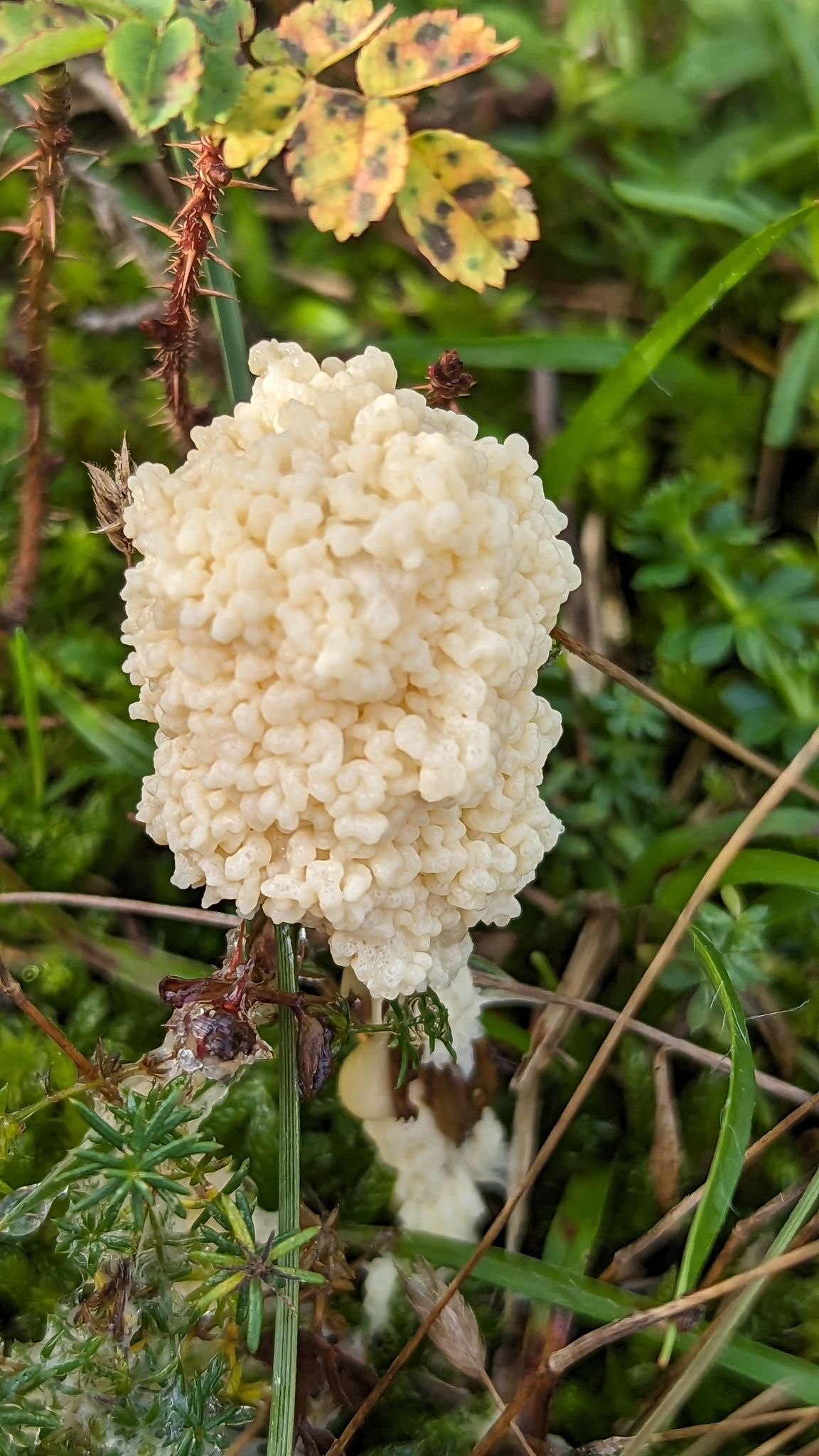

Scientific classification
- Domain: Eukaryota
- Phylum: Amoebozoa
- Class: Myxogastria
- Order: Physarales
- Family: Didymiaceae
- Genus: Didymium
- Species: D. spongiosum

Binomial name
- Didymium spongiosum (Leyss.) J.M. García-Martín, J.C. Zamora & Lado

Synonyms
- Mucilago crustacea P. Micheli ex F.H. Wigg.; Didymium mucilago Prikhodko, Shchepin, Novozh., Schnittler & Stephenson; Mucor spongiosus Leyss.; Spumaria mucilago Pers.

= Didymium spongiosum =

Genus of slime moulds

Didymium spongiosum, also known as dog sick slime mold, is a species of true slime mold in the order Physarales. Before reclassification in 2023 it was known as Mucilago crustacea. Due to its visual resemblance to canine vomit, it is known colloquially as the "dog sick slime mould" or "dog sick fungus", albeit that slime moulds are not true fungi.

The fruiting body is yellow to white, becoming paler with time, and then blackening.

It usually occurs on damp grass. The species was described by P. Micheli ex F.H. Wigg.
