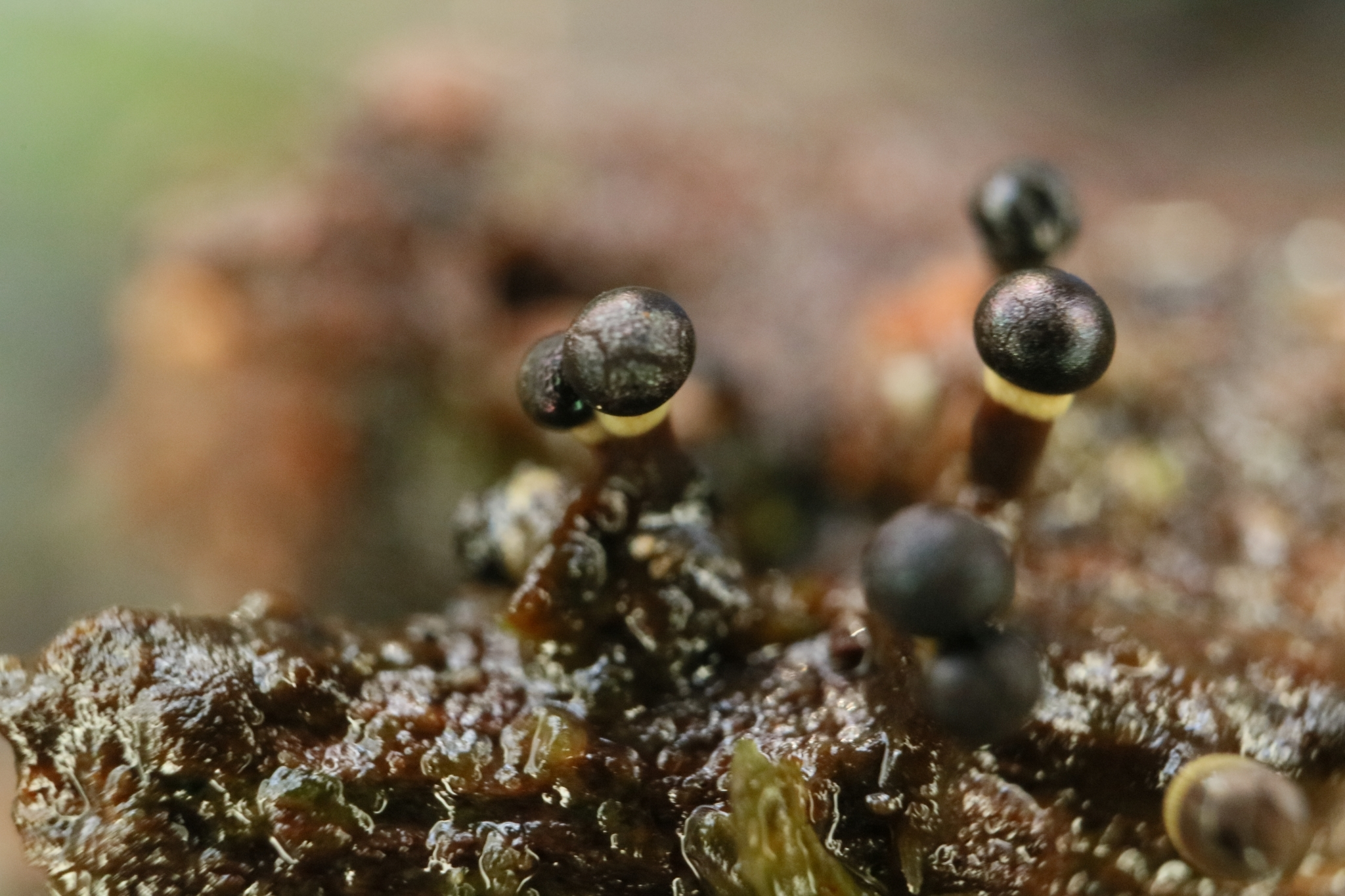
- Elaeomyxa cerifera – photo by Peta McDonald

Scientific classification
- Domain: Eukaryota
- Clade: Amorphea
- Phylum: Amoebozoa
- Class: Myxogastria
- Order: Physarales
- Family: Lamprodermataceae
- Genus: Elaeomyxa; Hagelst., 1942

= Elaeomyxa =

Genus of slime moulds

Elaeomyxa is a genus of slime molds in the family Lamprodermataceae. As of May 2022, there are four known species in the genus. Species in this genus have been documented in North America, Eurasia, Africa, and Australasia.

== Biology ==
The Elaeomyxa genus belongs to the true slime mold phylum Mycetozoa (also known as Myxomycetes) of fungus-like organisms that have at different times been classified in the protist, animal, and fungi kingdoms. Like other true slime molds, Elaeomyxa species have distinct life cycle phases. During the trophic (feeding or ingesting) stage, (Note: See: Saprotrophic nutrition for further information on the trophic stage.) called the plasmodium, the slime mold ingests food in an amoeba-like manner. The slime mold then transitions to the reproductive phase, in which fruiting bodies produce spores for reproduction.

== Species ==
The Elaeomyxa genus contains the following species:

- Elaeomyxa australiensis (S.L. Stephenson, G. Moreno & H. Singer) G. Moreno, H. Singer & S.L. Stephenson, 2008
- Elaeomyxa cerifera (G. Lister) Hagelst., 1942
- Elaeomyxa miyazakiensis (Emoto) Hagelst., 1942
- Elaeomyxa reticulospora (Gilert) G. Moreno, H. Singer & S.L. Stephenson, 2008
