= Plasmodiocarp =

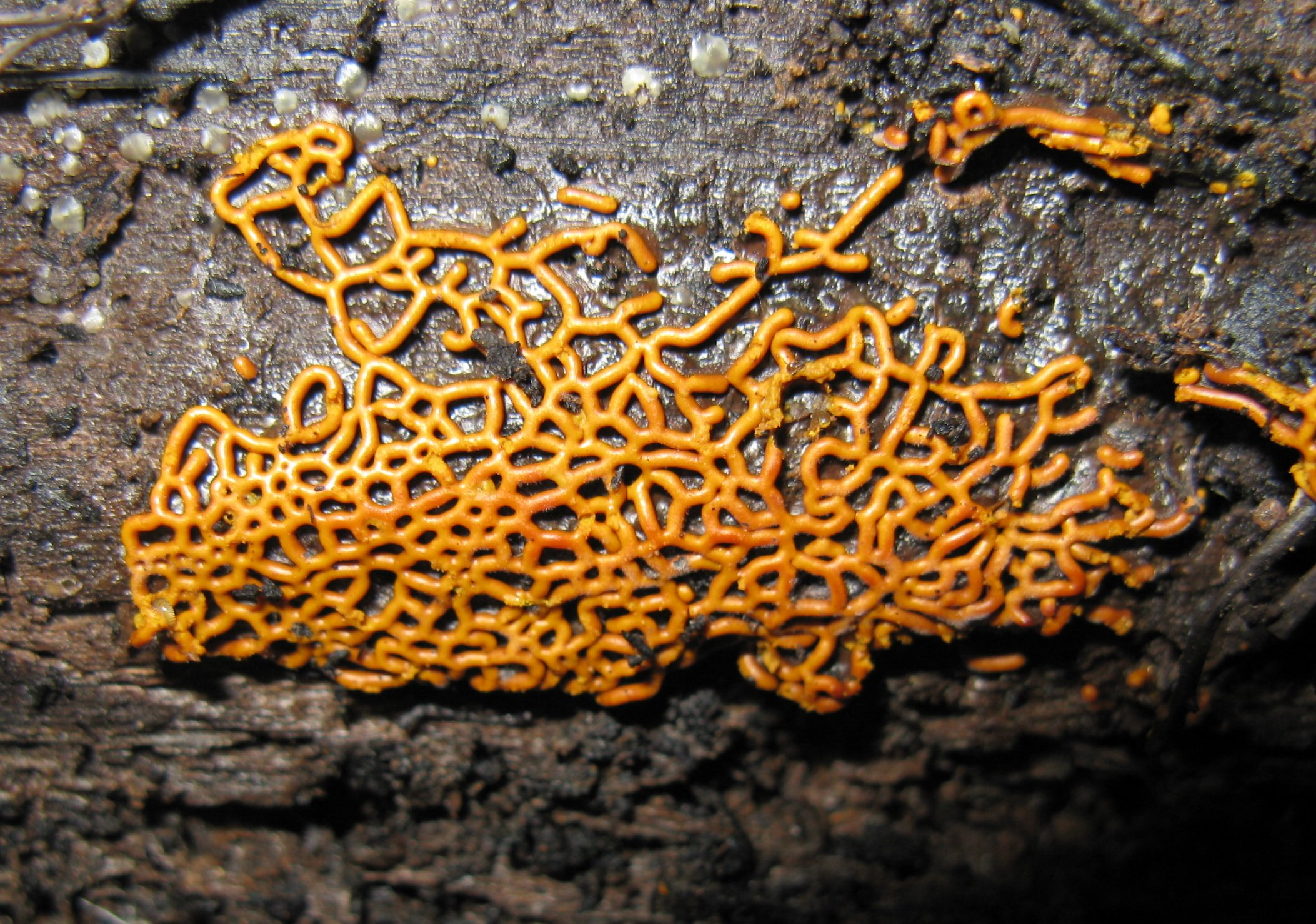
Plasmodiocarp of Hemitrichia serpula

A plasmodiocarp is a special form of fruit bodies of slime moulds. It is produced if the plasmodium concentrates during the fructification and pull back into the venetion of the plasmodium, from which the fruit body is created. The fruit body traces the process of the venetion, whereby the structure of its subsurface becomes plainly strand-shaped, branched, net or ring-shaped. The production of plasmodiocarps can be generic, or can be also caused by the deranged development of sporocarps or aethalia.

Slime moulds with plasmodiocarps including Physarum aeneum, Physarum bivalve, Physarum lateritium, Diderma effusum, Physarella oblonga, Willkommlangea reticulata or Hemitrichia serpula.
