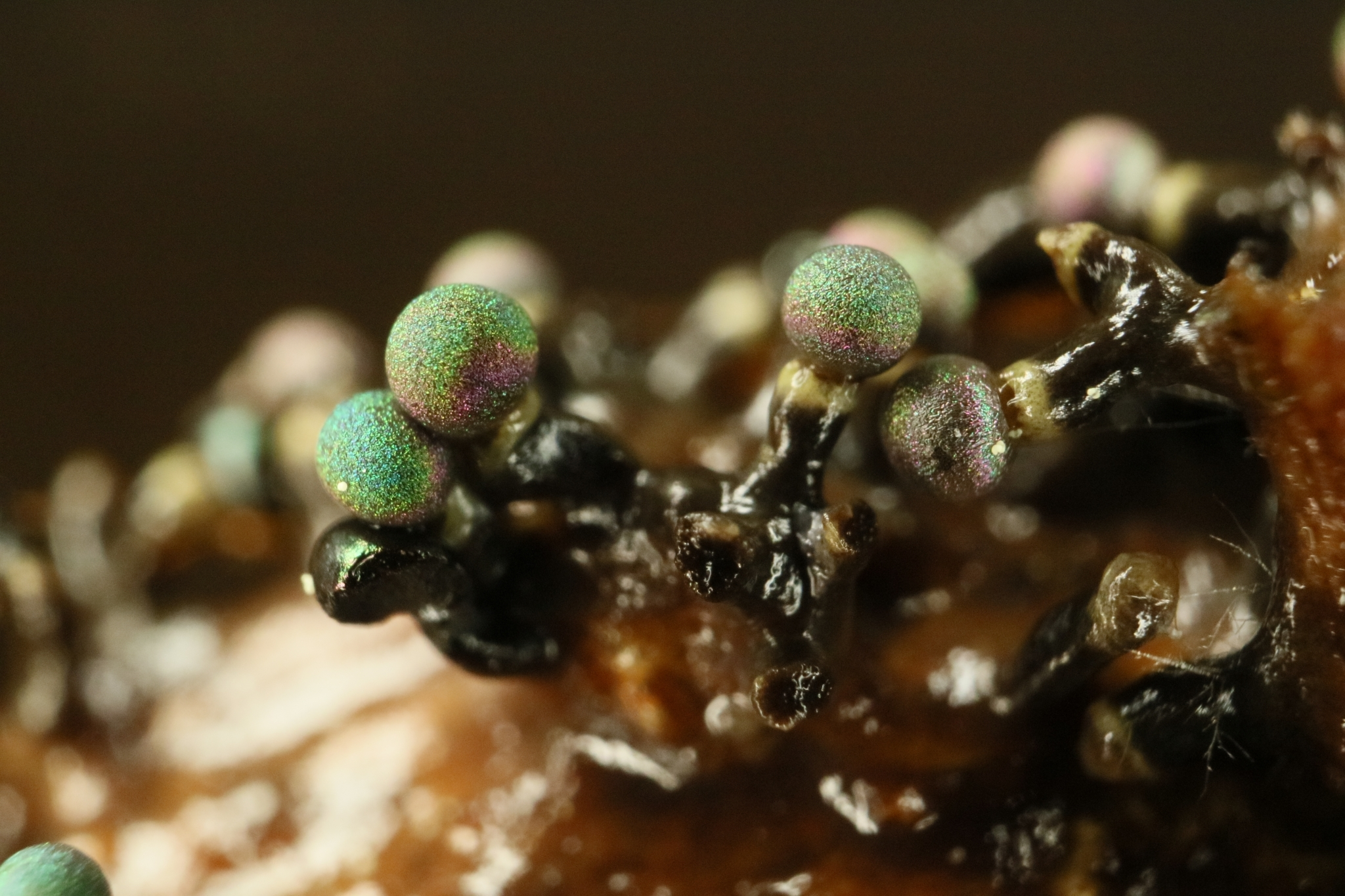
- Elaeomyxa cerifera

Scientific classification
- Domain: Eukaryota
- Phylum: Amoebozoa
- Class: Myxogastria
- Order: Physarales
- Family: Lamprodermataceae; T. Macbr.

= Lamprodermataceae =

Family of slime moulds

Lamprodermataceae is a family of slime molds in the order Physarales.

== Genera ==
The family contains the following five genera:

- Collaria Nann.-Bremek
- Colloderma G. Lister
- Diacheopsis Meyl.
- Elaeomyxa Hagelst.
- Lamproderma Rostaf.
