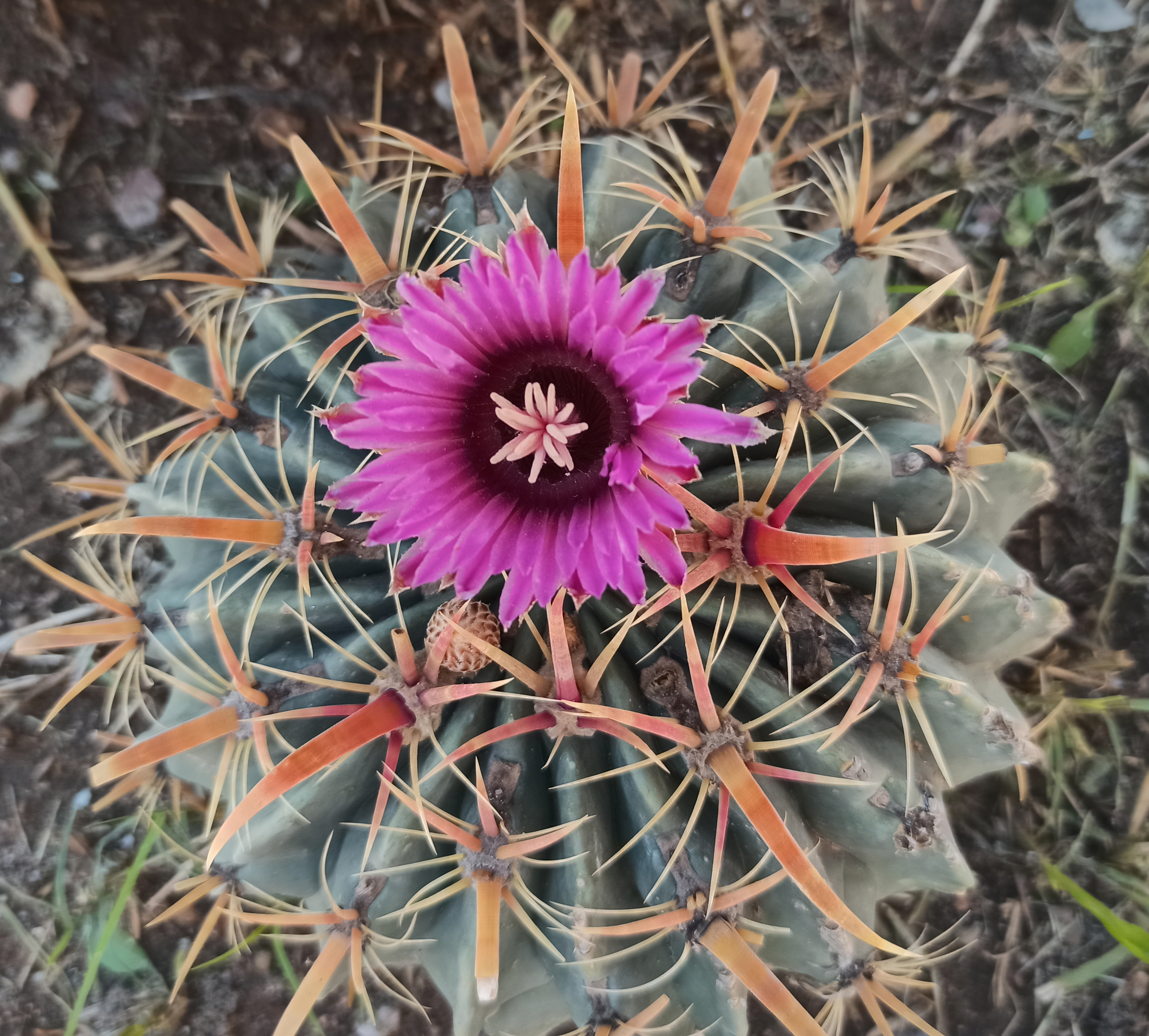
- Ferocactus latispinus in flower

Conservation status
- Least Concern (IUCN 3.1)

Scientific classification
- Kingdom: Plantae
- Clade: Tracheophytes
- Clade: Angiosperms
- Clade: Eudicots
- Order: Caryophyllales
- Family: Cactaceae
- Subfamily: Cactoideae
- Genus: Ferocactus
- Species: F. latispinus

Binomial name
- Ferocactus latispinus (Haworth) Britton & Rose

Synonyms
- Bisnaga latispina (Haw.) Doweld 2000; Bisnaga recurva subsp. latispina (Haw.) Doweld 1999; Cactus latispinus Haw. 1824; Echinocactus cornigerus var. latispinus (Haw.) C.F.Först. 1846; Echinocactus latispinus (Haw.) Hemsl. 1880; Echinocactus recurvus var. latispinus (Haw.) Mittl. 1841; Ferocactus recurvus var. latispinus (Haw.) G.Unger 1992; Mammillaria latispina (Haw.) Tate 1840; Melocactus latispinus (Haw.) Pfeiff. 1837

= Ferocactus latispinus =

Species of cactus

Ferocactus latispinus is a species of barrel cactus native to Mexico.

== Description ==
Ferocactus latispinus grows as a single globular light green cactus reaching the dimensions of 30 centimetres (12 in) to 1 meter in height and 40 centimetres (16 in) across, with 21 acute ribs. Its spines range from reddish to white in color and are flattened. The four central spines growing up to 4–5 centimetres (1.6–2.0 in) long and 4–9 millimetres (0.16–0.35 in) wide and 5-15 marginal spines that are straight or recurved. Flowering is in late autumn or early winter. The funnel-shaped flowers are purplish or yellowish and reach 4 cm long, and are followed by oval-shaped scaled fruit which reach 2.5 centimetres (0.98 in) long.

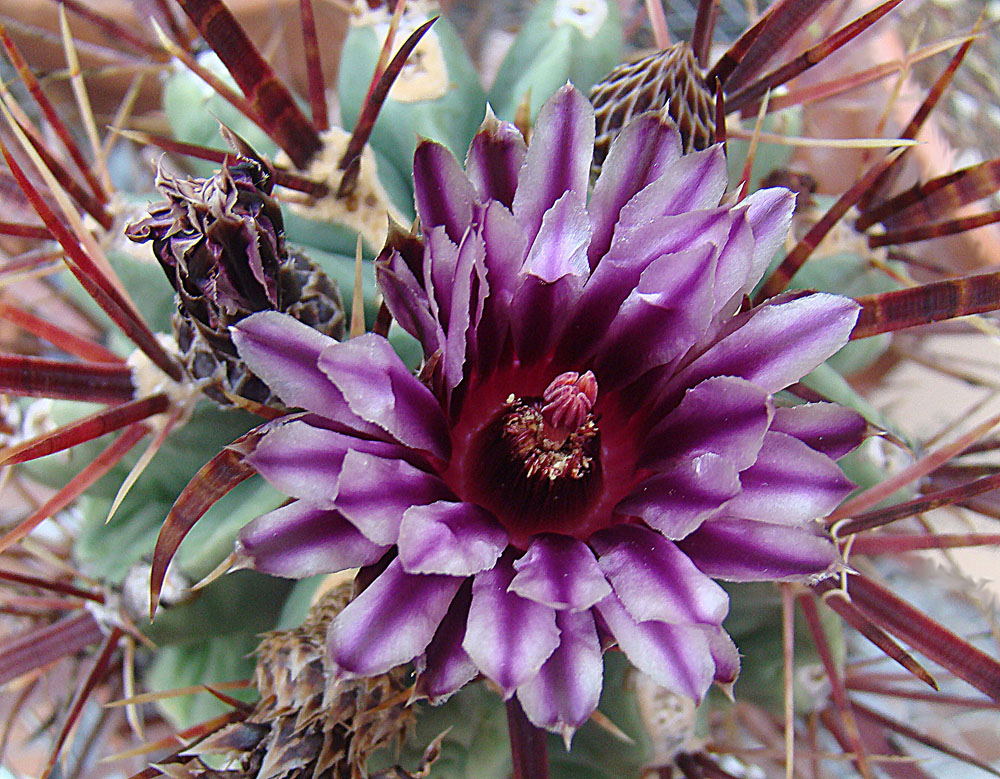
Flower

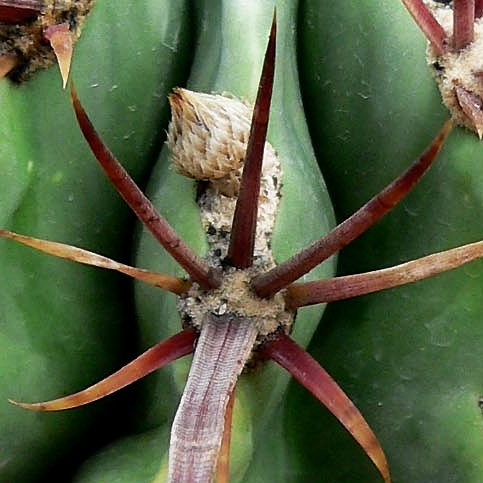
Spines closeup

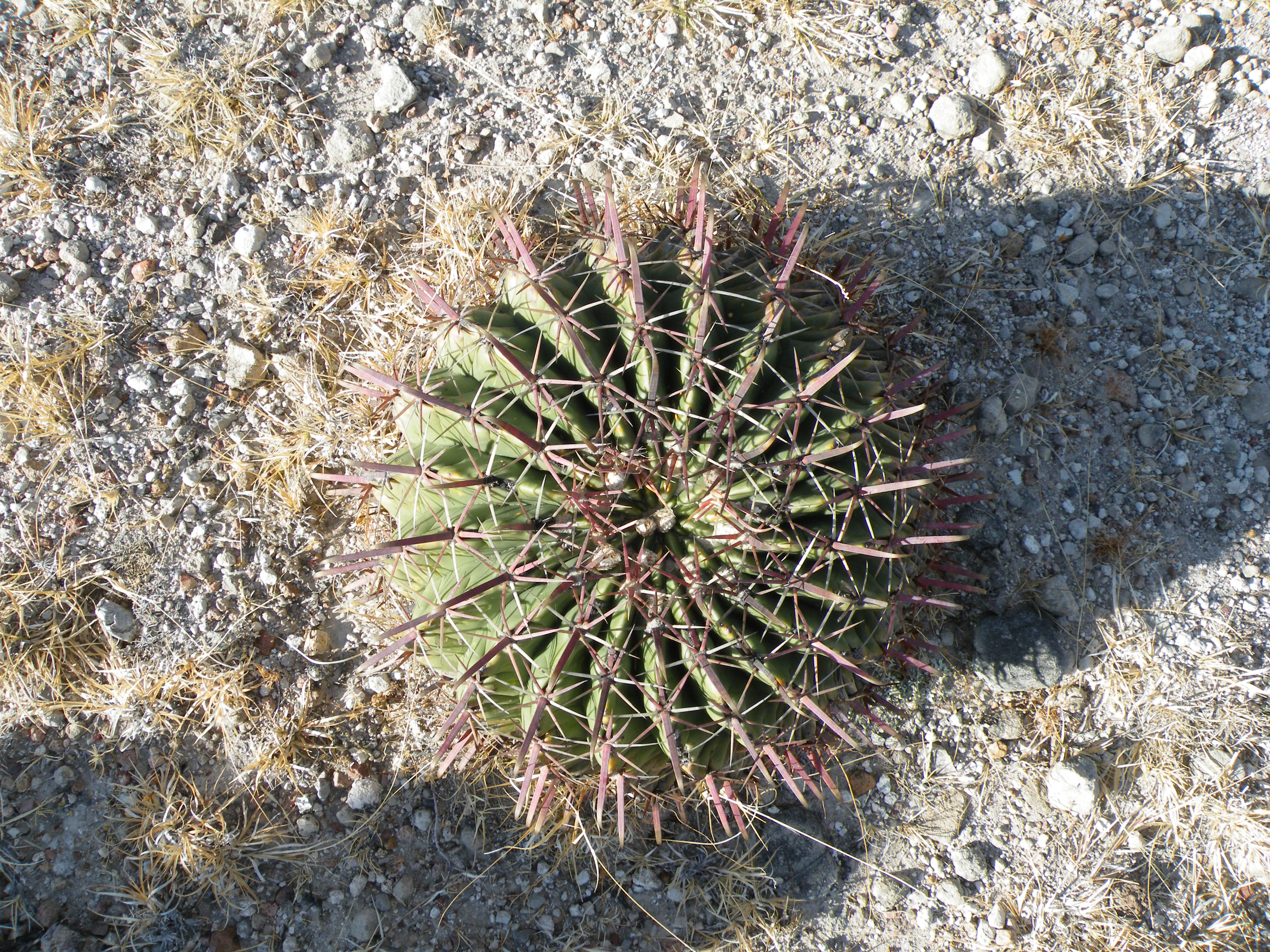
Plant

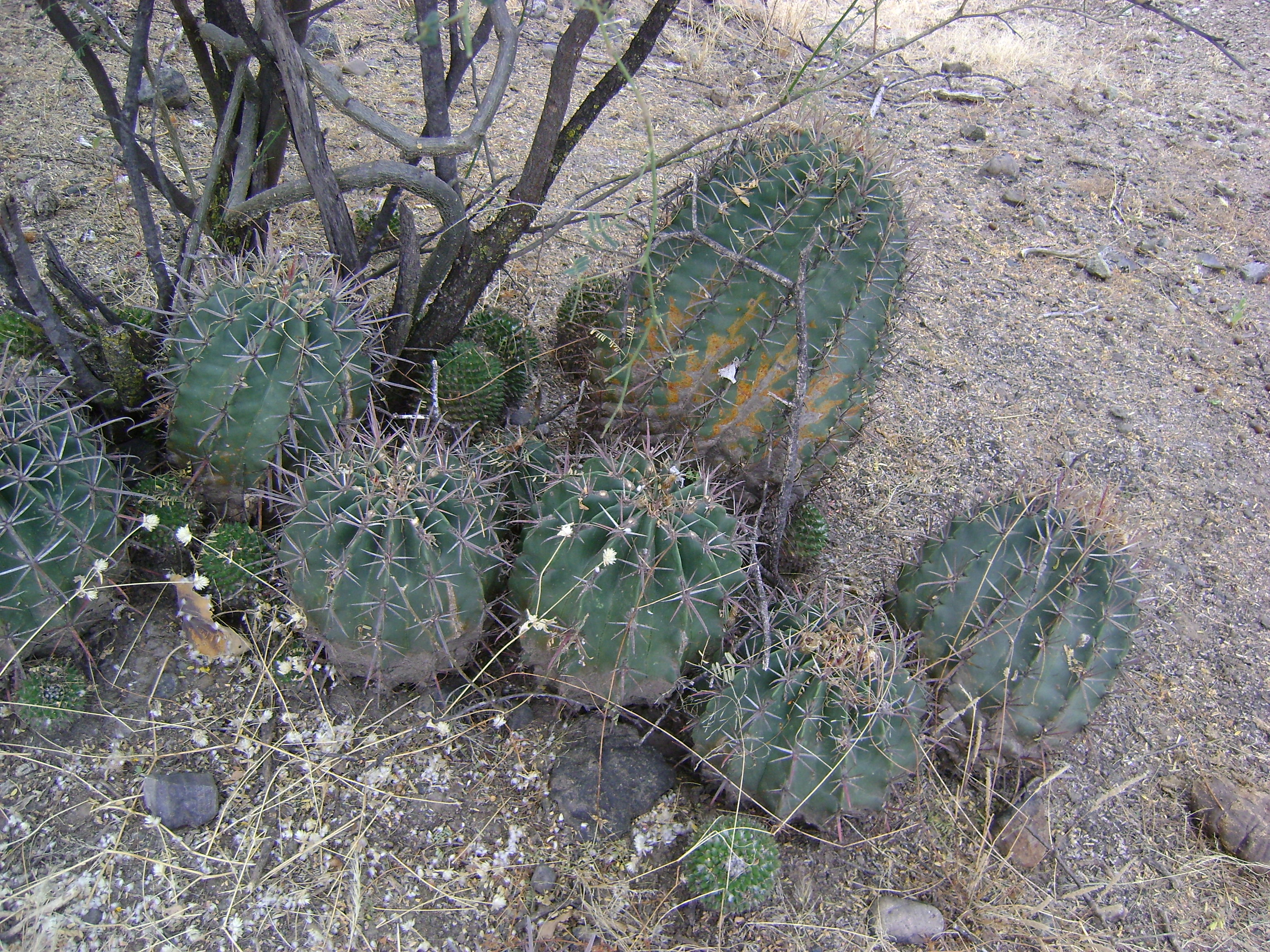
Clump of plants

=== Subspecies ===
Two subspecies are recognised, differing in their number of radial spines.

Image	Name	Description	Distribution
	Ferocactus latispinus subsp. greenwoodii (Glass) N.P.Taylor	4-5 radial spines	Mexico (Oaxaca)
	Ferocactus latispinus subsp. latispinus	9–15 radial spines, Devil's Tongue Barrel or Crow's Claw Cactus.	Mexico (Durango to Puebla)
	Ferocactus latispinus subsp. spiralis (Karw. ex Pfeiff.) N.P.Taylor	grows up to 1 meter tall, 5–7 radial spines	Mexico (Veracruz, Puebla, Oaxaca).

== Distribution ==
The species is endemic to Mexico; the more widely distributed subspecies latispinus ranges from southeastern Durango, through Zacatecas, Aguascalientes, east to the western parts of San Luis Potosí, Hidalgo and Puebla, as well as to eastern Jalisco, Guanajuato, Querétaro and Mexico State. Subspecies spiralis is restricted to the southern parts of Oaxaca and Puebla. This species is typically found under nurse plants like tree canopies and shrubs. Plants are found growing in oak forest, grasslands, silt flats, and in rocky outcrops at elevations of 600 to 2,600 metres (2,000 to 8,500 ft). These nurse plants protect these smaller plant species below them from harsh weather conditions; being able to provide shade for the cacti in arid and sunny environments.

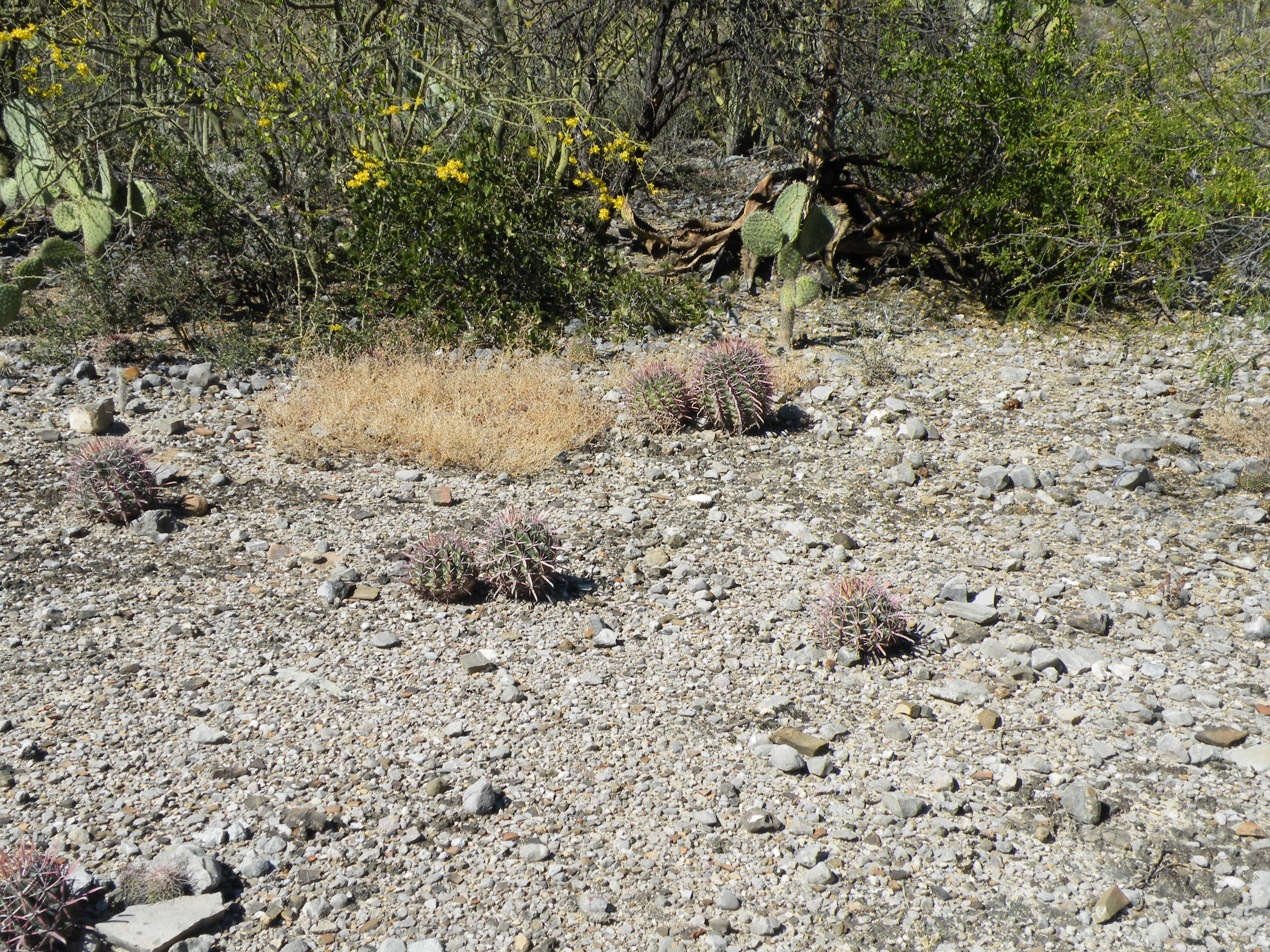
F. recurvus habitat in Zapotitlan De Las Salinas, Puebla

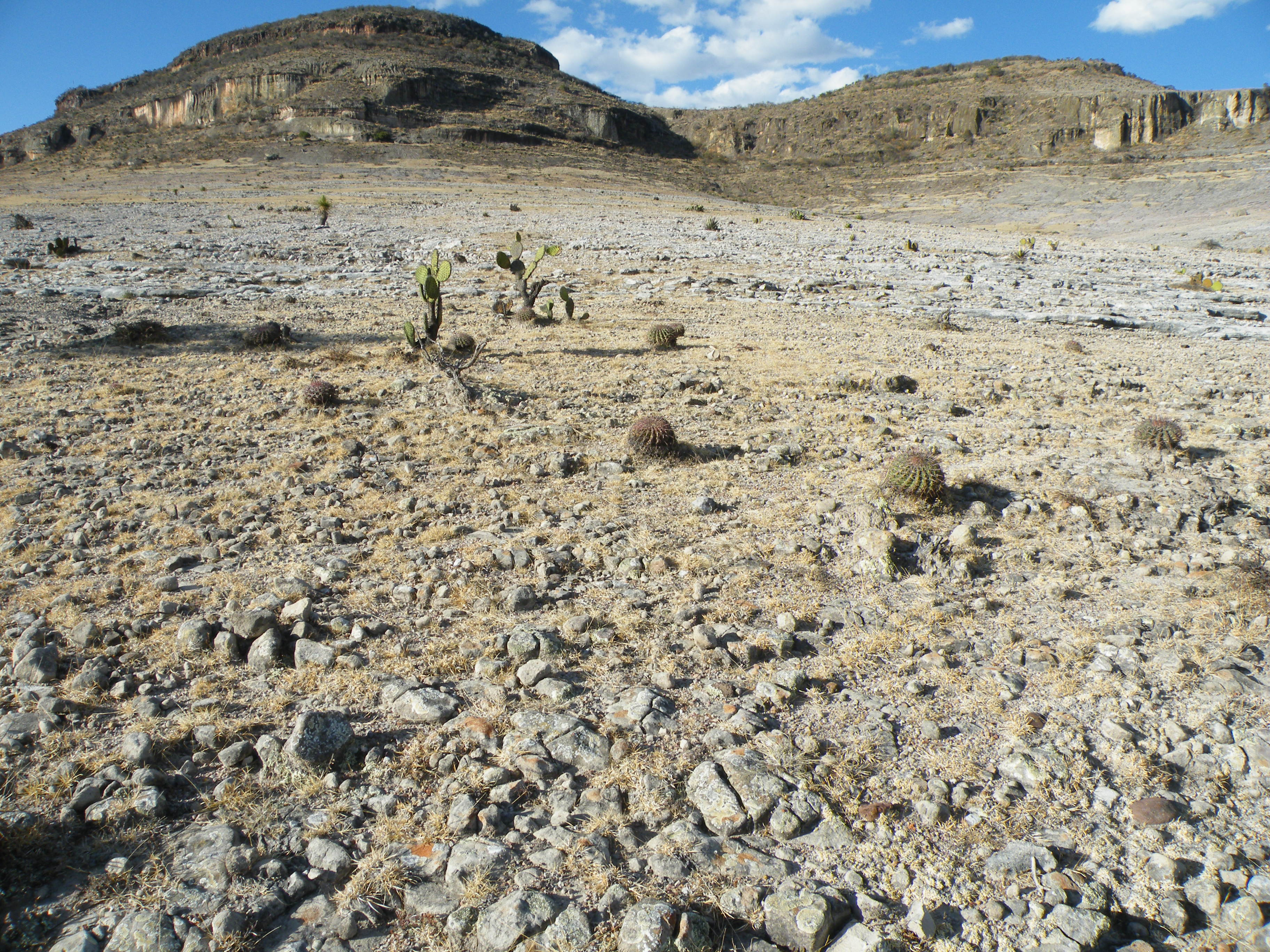
Habitat near Concepcion buenavista, Oaxaca

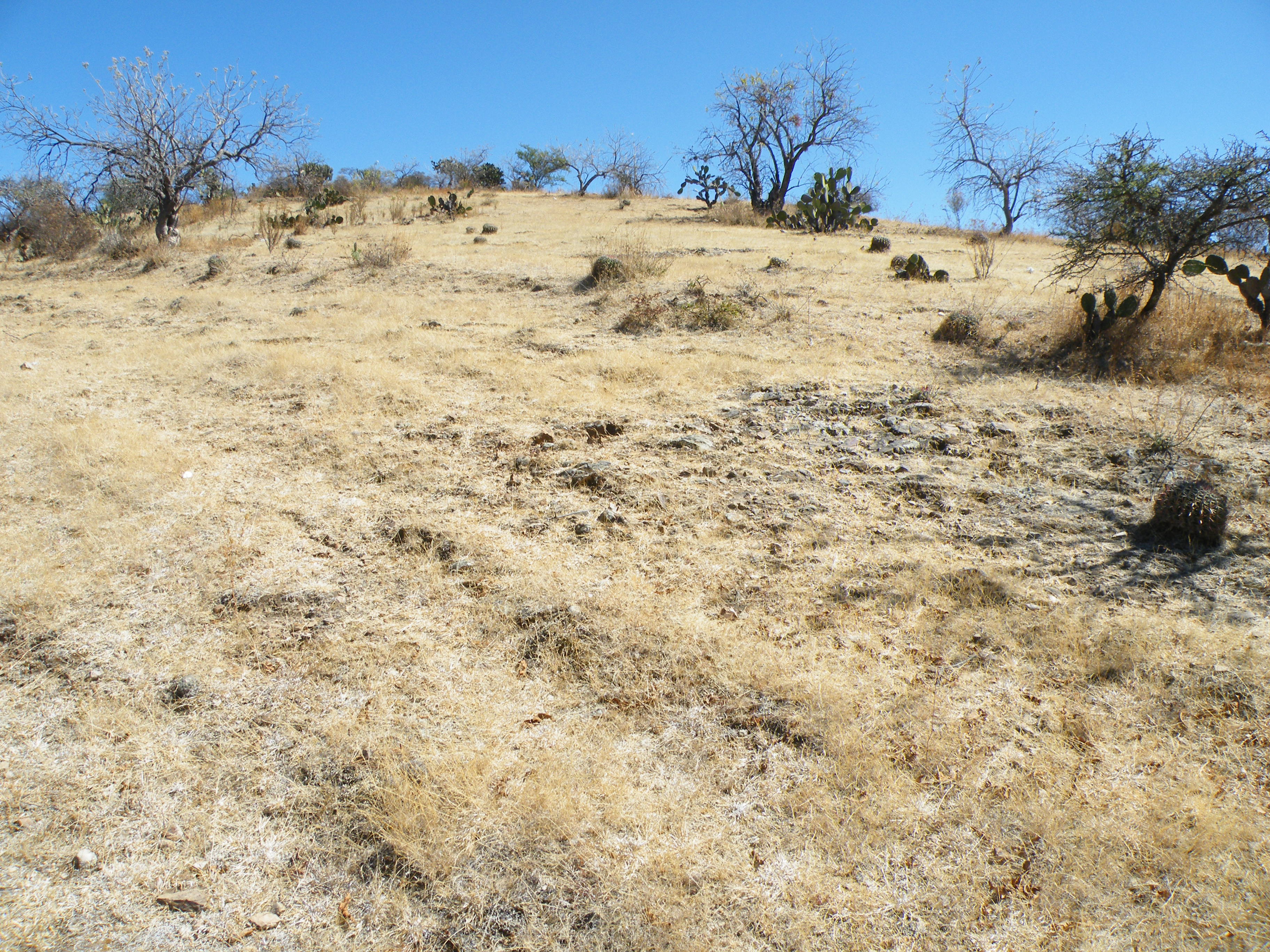
Plants growing in grasslands with oaks near Teotongo, Oaxaca

== Taxonomy ==
Originally described as Cactus latispinus in 1824 by English naturalist Adrian Hardy Haworth, it gained its current name in 1922 with the erection of the genus Ferocactus by American botanists Britton and Rose. The species name is derived from the Latin latus "broad", and spinus "spine". Ferocactus recurvus is a former name for the species.

== Cultivation ==
Ferocactus latispinus is fairly commonly cultivated as an ornamental plant. It blooms at an early age which is a desirable horticultural feature. It is hardy to −4 °C, with an average minimum temperature of 10 °C.

The slime mold, Didymium wildpretii feeds on the decaying remains of F. latispinus in Mexico.
