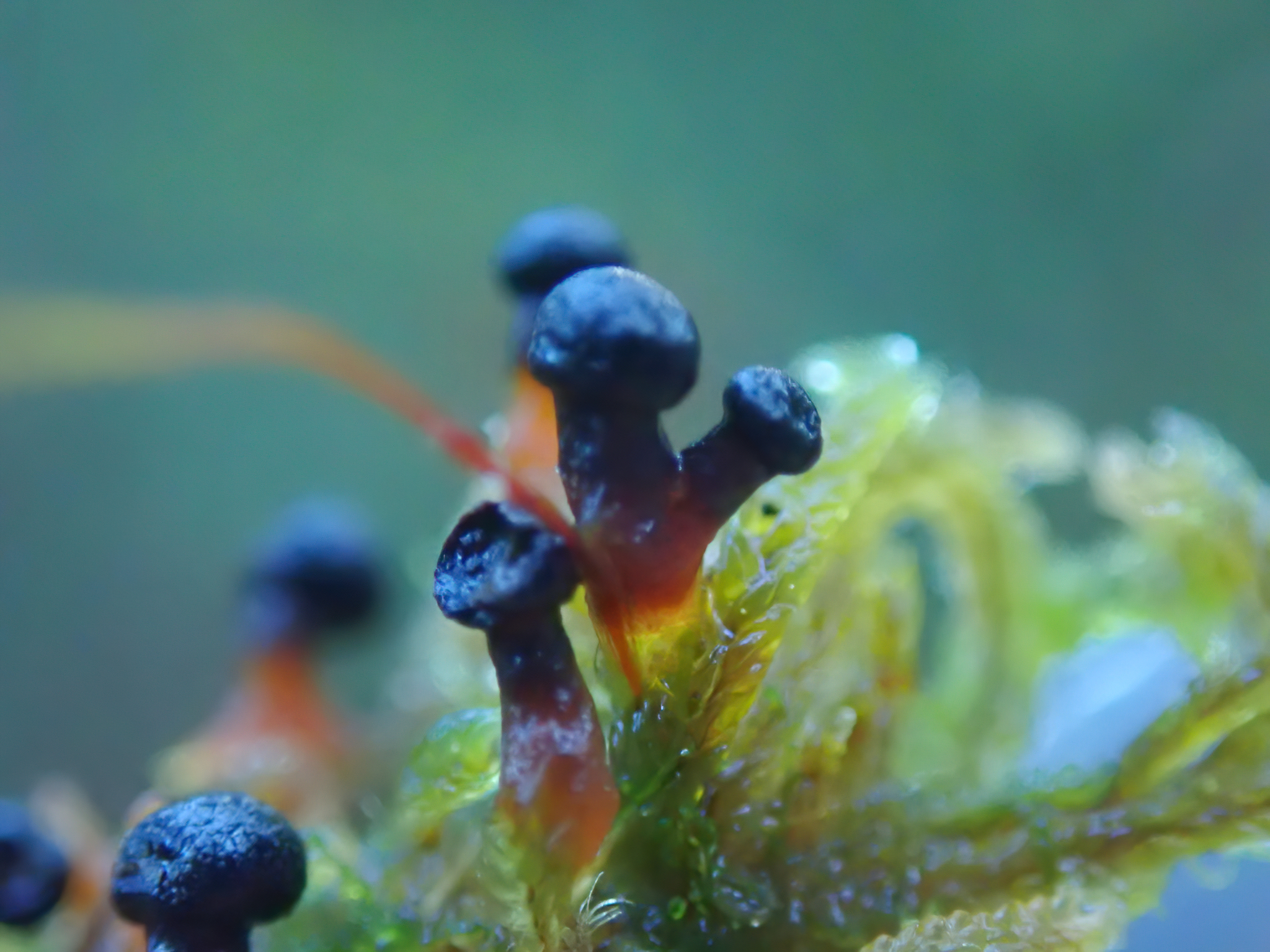
- Lepidoderma tigrinum

Scientific classification
- Domain: Eukaryota
- Clade: Amorphea
- Phylum: Amoebozoa
- Class: Myxogastria
- Order: Physarales
- Family: Didymiaceae
- Genus: Lepidoderma de Bary

= Lepidoderma (slime mold) =

Genus of slime molds

Lepidoderma is a genus of slime molds in the family Didymiaceae.

== Selected species ==
- Lepidoderma aggregatum Kowalski, 1971
- Lepidoderma carestianum (Rabenh.) Rostaf., 1874
- Lepidoderma chailletii Rostaf., 1874
- Lepidoderma crassipes Flatau, Massner & Schirmer, 1987
- Lepidoderma crustaceum Kowalski, 1967
- Lepidoderma didermoides Kowalski, 1971
- Lepidoderma stipitatum Flatau, 1984
- Lepidoderma tigrinum (Schrad.) Rostaf., 1873
