= Rostafinskia =

Scientific classification
- Kingdom: Fungi
- Division: Ascomycota
- Class: incertae sedis
- Order: incertae sedis
- Family: incertae sedis
- Genus: Rostafinskia; Speg. 1880

Type species
- Rostafinskia australis Speg. 1880

Species
- Rostafinskia australis Speg. 1880

Genus of fungi

Rostafinskia is a genus of fungi in the Ascomycota phylum. The relationship of this taxon to other taxa within the phylum is unknown (incertae sedis), and it has not yet been placed with certainty into any class, order, or family.

The genus name of Rostafinskia is in honour of Józef Tomasz Rostafínsky (1850–1928), who was a Polish botanist (Algology and Mycology), and Professor of Botany and Director of the Botanical Garden at Jagiellonian University in Kraków between 1873 - 1912.

Note: Rostafinskia elegans Racib. 1884 is a name brought to synonymy to Collaria elegans (Racib.) Dhillon & Nann.-Bremek. ex Ing, 1982.

== See also ==
- List of Ascomycota genera incertae sedis
