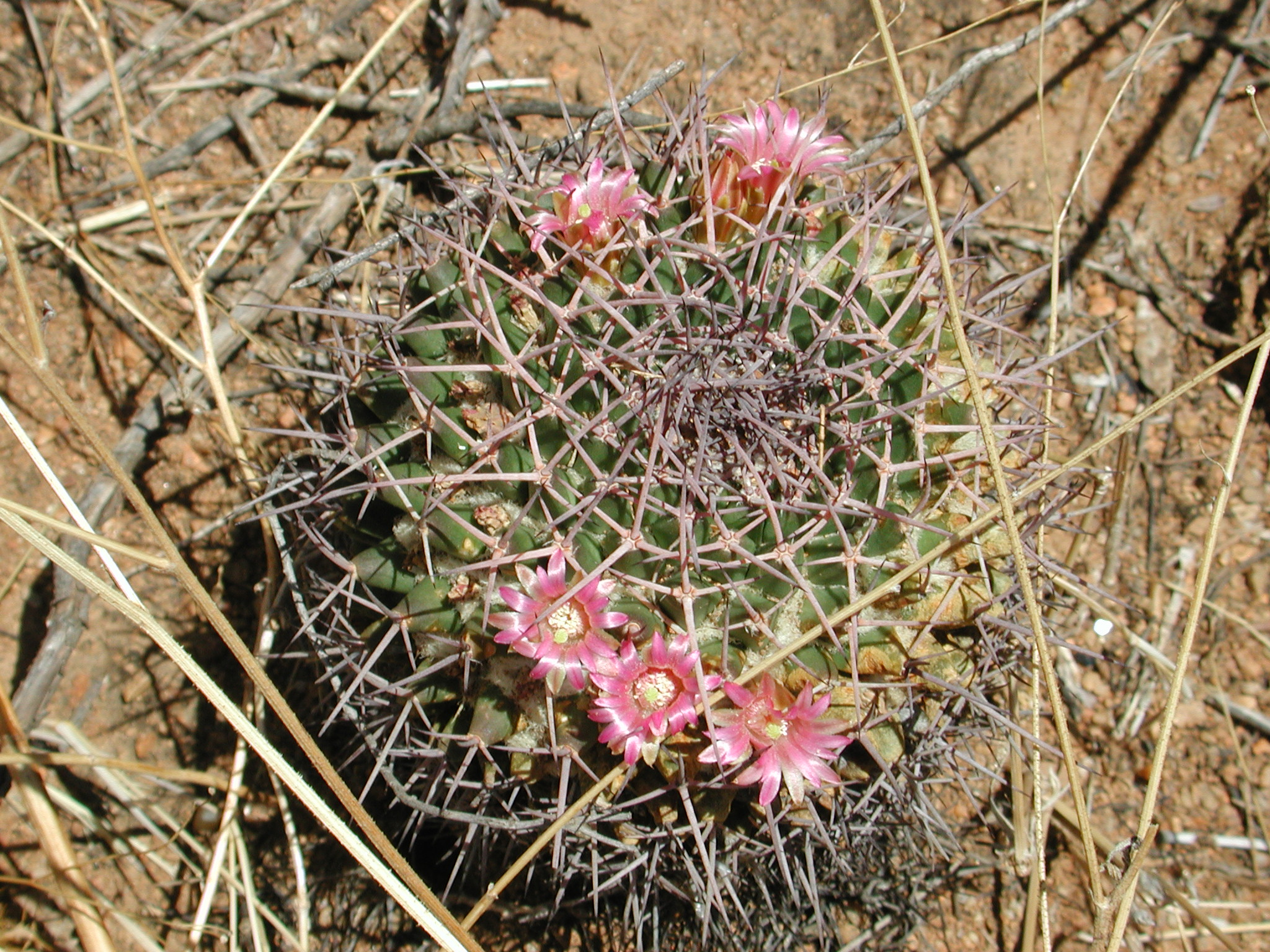

Conservation status
- Least Concern (IUCN 3.1)

Scientific classification
- Kingdom: Plantae
- Clade: Tracheophytes
- Clade: Angiosperms
- Clade: Eudicots
- Order: Caryophyllales
- Family: Cactaceae
- Subfamily: Cactoideae
- Genus: Mammillaria
- Species: M. carnea

Binomial name
- Mammillaria carnea Zucc, Pfeiff, 1837

Synonyms
- Cactus carneus (Zucc. ex Pfeiff.) Kuntze 1891; Mammillaria villifera var. carnea (Zucc. ex Pfeiff.) Salm-Dyck 1850; Neomammillaria carnea (Zucc. ex Pfeiff.) Britton & Rose 1923; Cactus aeruginosus (Scheidw.) Kuntze 1891; Cactus pallescens (Scheidw.) Kuntze 1891; Cactus subtetragonus (A.Dietr.) Kuntze 1891; Cactus villifer (Otto ex Pfeiff.) Kuntze 1891; Mammillaria aeruginosa Scheidw. 1840; Mammillaria carnea var. aeruginosa (Scheidw.) Gürke 1905; Mammillaria carnea var. cirrosa (Salm-Dyck) Gürke 1905; Mammillaria carnea var. robustispina R.T.Craig 1945; Mammillaria carnea var. subtetragona (A.Dietr.) Backeb. 1961; Mammillaria carnea var. villifera (Otto ex Pfeiff.) Gürke 1905; Mammillaria pallescens Scheidw. 1841; Mammillaria subtetragona A.Dietr. 1840; Mammillaria villifera Otto ex Pfeiff. 1837; Mammillaria villifera var. aeruginosa (Scheidw.) Salm-Dyck 1850; Mammillaria villifera var. cirrosa Salm-Dyck 1850; Neomammillaria carnea var. cirrosa (Salm-Dyck) Y.Itô 1981; Neomammillaria villifera (Otto ex Pfeiff.) Britton & Rose 1923

= Mammillaria carnea =

Species of cactus

Mammillaria carnea is a species of cactus in the subfamily Cactoideae.

== Description ==
Mammillaria carnea grows solitary and in clusters up to 20 centimeters tall and 8 to 12 centimeters in diameter, transitioning from spherical to cylindrical in shape. The plant has firm, angular warts that contain milky sap. It features four stiff, pink-brown central spines with black tips, measuring 0.8 to 2 centimeters long. Radial spines are either absent or appear as bristles.

The plant produces funnel-shaped, light pink flowers that are 1.5 to 2 centimeters long and 1.2 to 1.5 centimeters in diameter. Its red fruits contain brown seeds.

== Distribution ==
Mammillaria carnea is native to the Mexican states of Guerrero, Puebla, and Oaxaca growing on plains and slopes of the deciduous forest at elevations of 500 to 2000 meters.

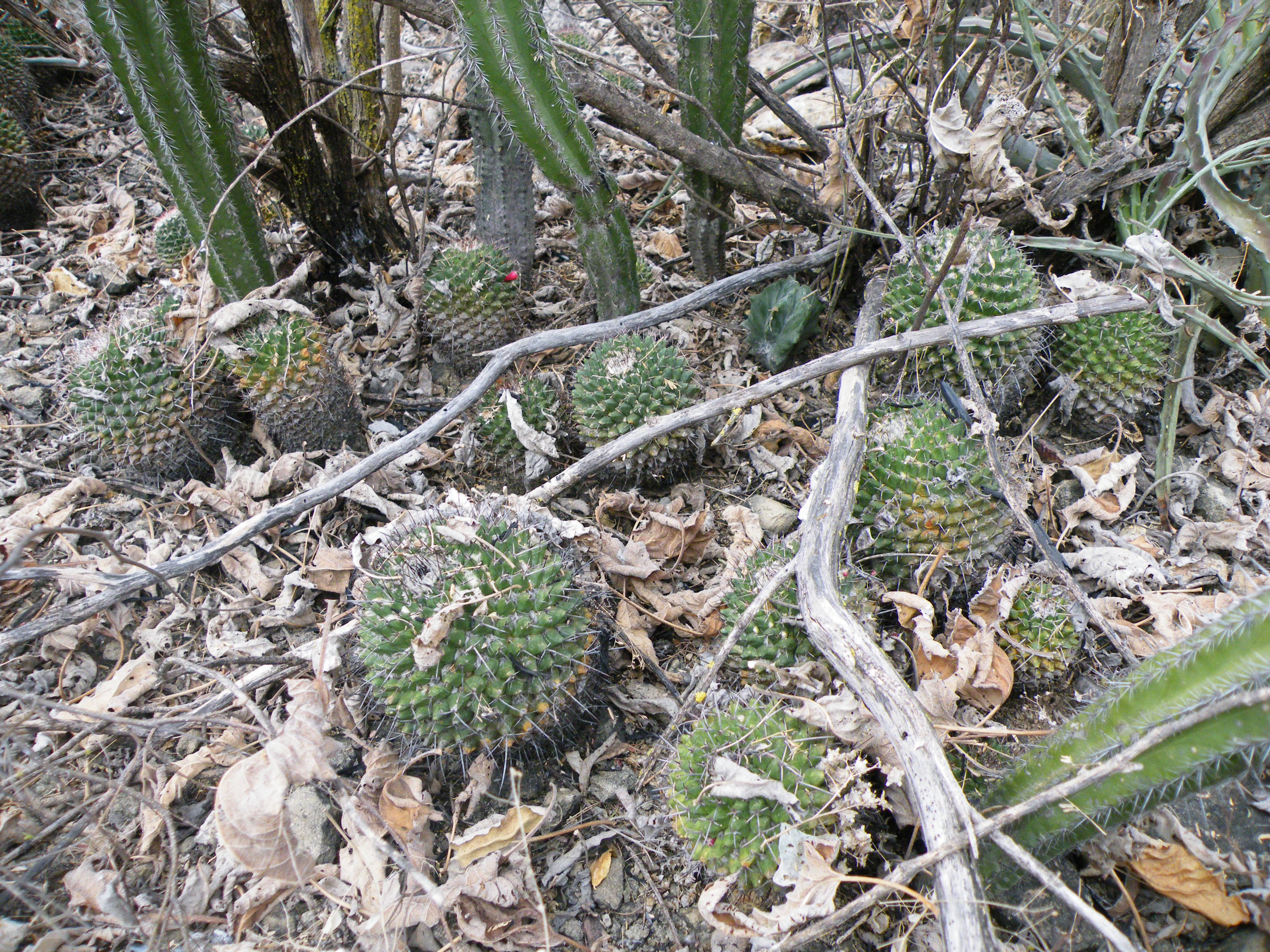
Plants near Calipan, Puebla

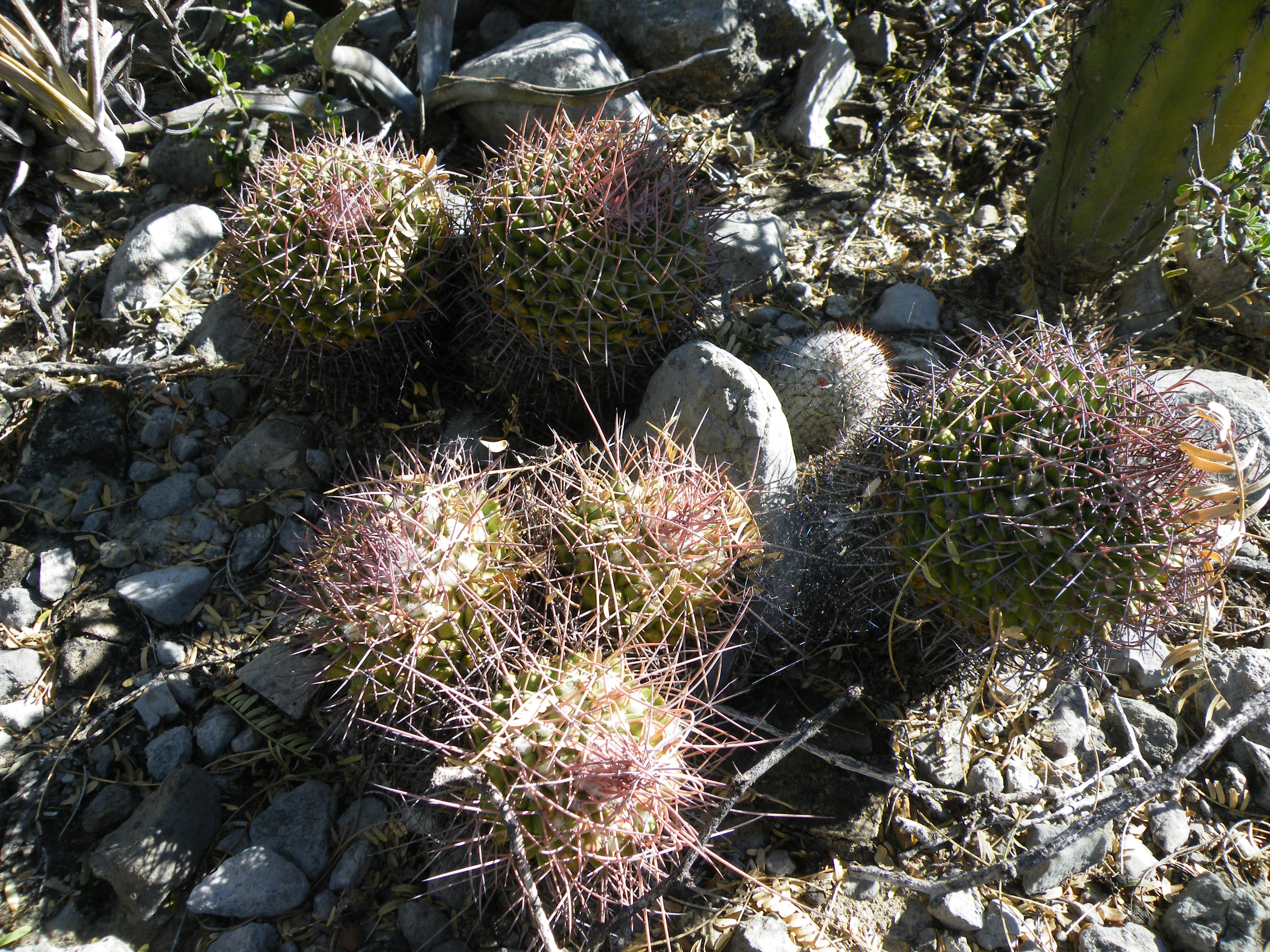
Plants growing near Zapotitlan De Las Salinas, Puebla

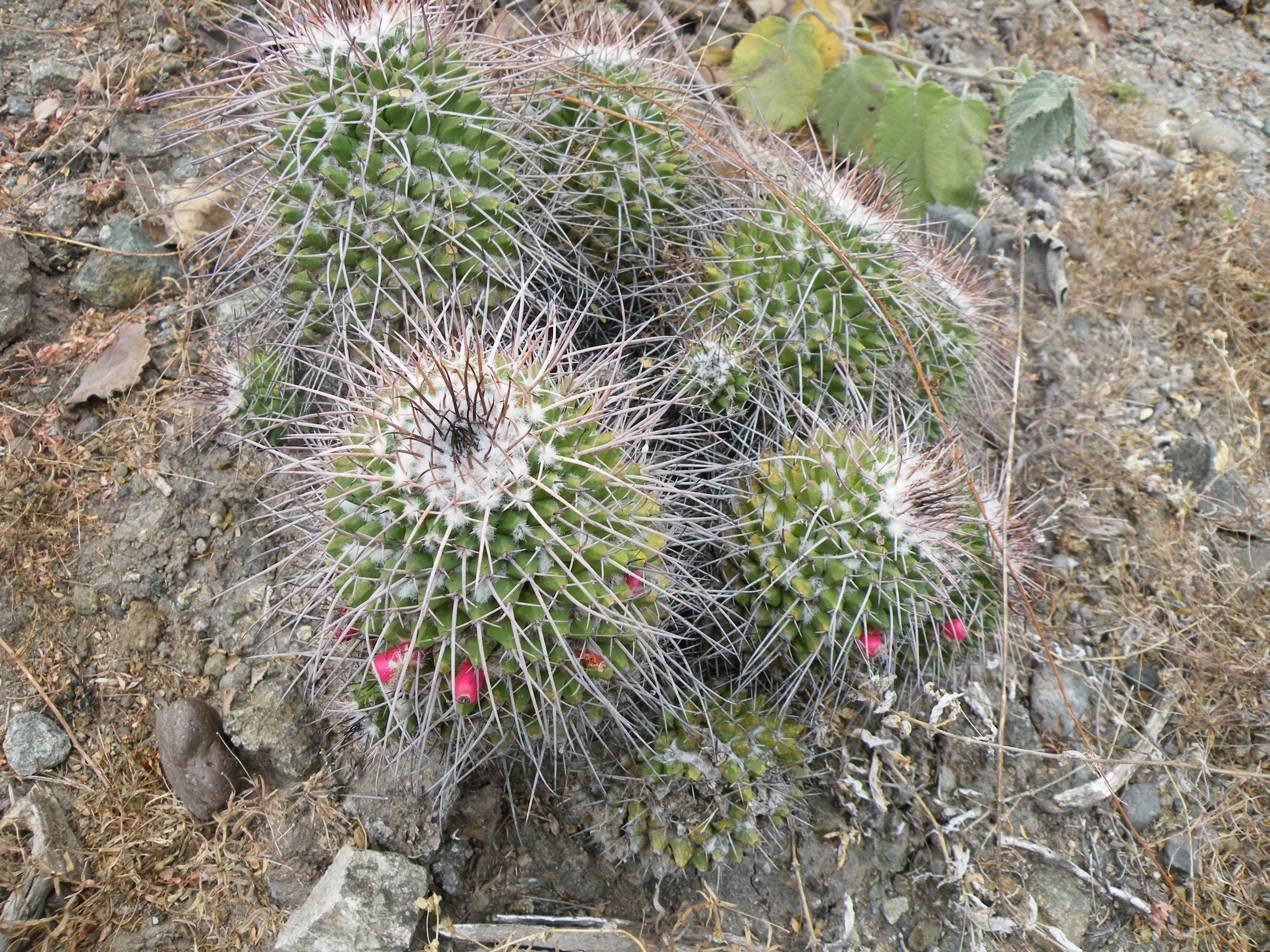
Plants growing near Tomellin, Oaxaca

== Taxonomy ==
First described in 1837 by Ludwig Georg Karl Pfeiffer, the specific epithet "carnea" means 'flesh-colored.'
