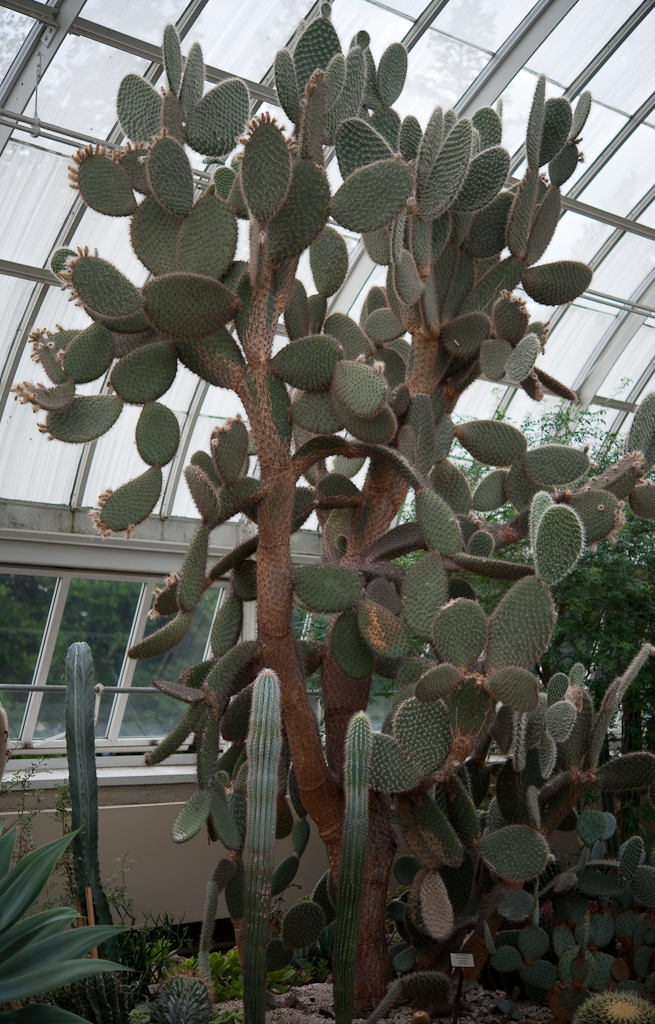

Scientific classification
- Kingdom: Plantae
- Clade: Tracheophytes
- Clade: Angiosperms
- Clade: Eudicots
- Order: Caryophyllales
- Family: Cactaceae
- Genus: Opuntia
- Species: O. pilifera

Binomial name
- Opuntia pilifera F.A.C.Weber

= Opuntia pilifera =

Species of plant

Opuntia pilifera is a species of plants in the family Cactaceae (cacti). They are listed in CITES Appendix II.

== Sources ==
This article incorporates text from a free content work. Licensed under CC0 (license statement/permission). Text taken from Opuntia pilifera. Encyclopedia of Life.
