= Robert Hagelstein =

American botanist and mycologist

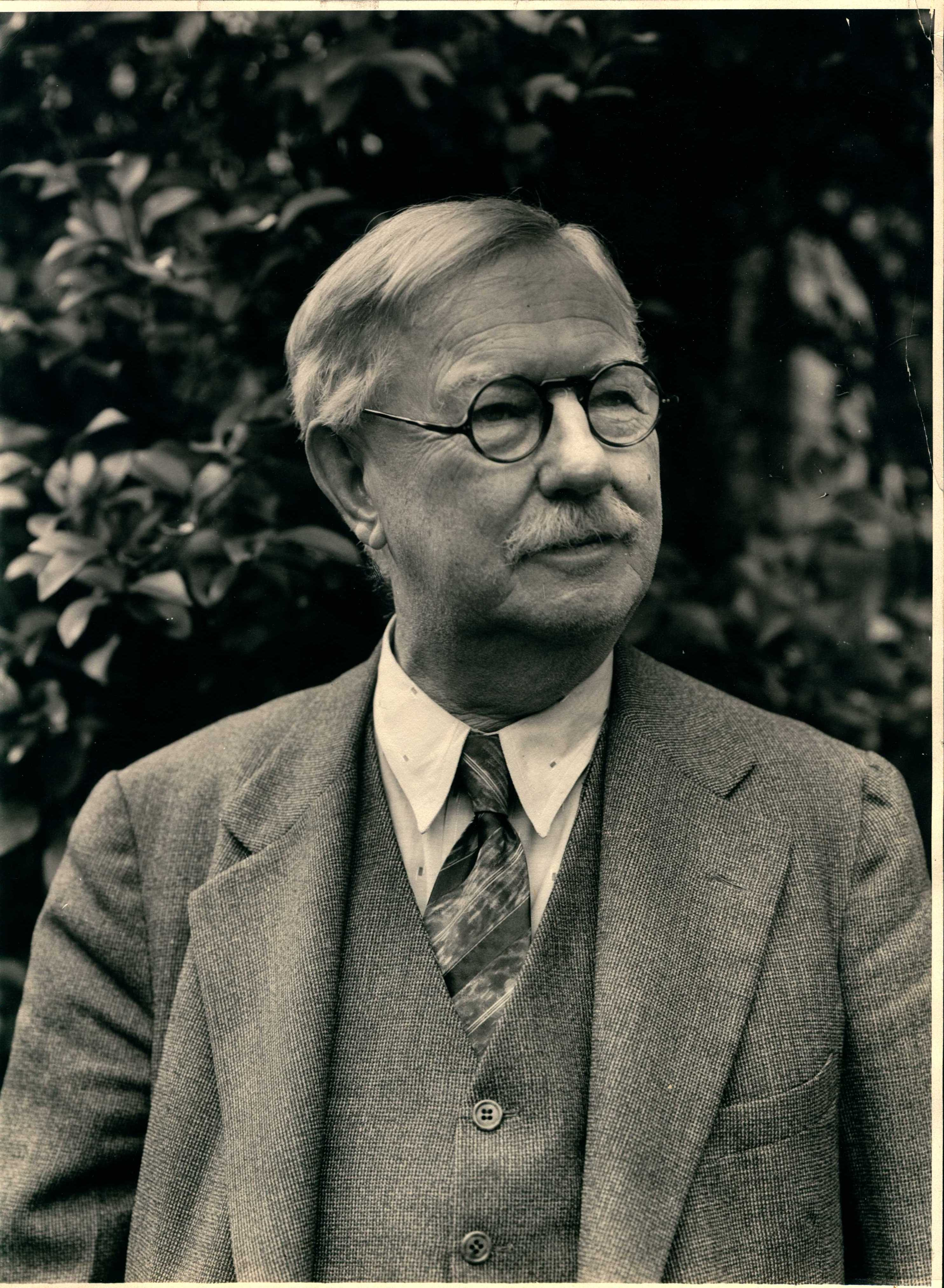
- Portrait of Robert Hagelstein, date unknown
- Born: 16 May 1870; Brooklyn, New York
- Died: 20 August 1945; Mineoloa, New York
- Known for: Field and taxonomy work in diatomology and myxomycetology
- Awards: Fellow of the New York Microscopical Society and Royal Microscopical Society
- Scientific career
- Fields: biology, microbiology, mycology, botany
- Institutions: New York Botanical Garden
- Author abbrev. (botany): Hagelst.

Robert Hagelstein (May 16, 1870 – Oct. 20, 1945) was a multidisciplinary businessman, scientist, and microscopy expert who served for fifteen years as the Honorary Curator of Myxomycetes at the New York Botanical Garden. He is known for his work in algae and slime mold specimen collection and curation, and for making hands-on learning materials widely available to student and amateur scientists.

== Early life ==
Robert Hagelstein was born in Brooklyn, New York on May 16, 1870. His earliest scientific explorations centered on minerals, but he later became interested in biology and microscopy. He graduated from high school in Brooklyn and developed his skills in microscopy at the Brooklyn Institute of Arts and Sciences. He lived for some time in Brooklyn and later moved to Mineola, New York, which was a short drive from one of his primary field sites for specimen collection.

== Career ==
After graduating from high school, Hagelstein initially chose a career track in business with the J. and D. Lehman Company glove manufacturer in New York City. However, he kept up his scientific pursuits as a hobby for decades, and was able to specialize and develop connections with others interested in science through his ongoing involvement with the Department of Microscopy at the Brooklyn Institute of Arts and Sciences. Over the years the microscopy department declined and many of its most active participants, including Hagelstein, resumed their work at the New York Microscopical Society during World War One. Hagelstein focused primarily on the study and photomicrography of diatoms—a type of algae—and became vice president of the society in 1921 and president in 1923. In 1925 he retired from his business management position and pursued his scientific work on a full-time basis.

The applied mathematical abilities Hagelstein had acquired from his work in business finances served him well in calculations related to microscopy measurements. His research colleague Joseph F. Burke observed that, in general, Hagelstein's business background was an asset in his scientific work:

It is interesting to recall from personal observation ... the effect of business training in his approach to scientific study. A well developed habit of work was evident to all who came in contact with him. He had retired not to relax, though many business men find in scientific pursuits a relaxation from the stress of business. Rather, he retired to start a new career in which he set himself objectives that were pursued on a schedule as rigid as any in business. ... More than anything else his business training was noticeable in the action of his mind in dealing with intricate problems, requiring the sorting and evaluating of facts to arrive at sound conclusions. This ability was reflected not only in his taxonomic work but in his participation in the administration of the affairs of scientific societies.

Hagelstein continued to focus on diatoms in his microscopy work for many years, creating an extensive collection of diatom slides that consisted primarily of specimens from Long Island. He was later invited by Dr. Nathaniel Lord Britton to collect diatom specimens in 1926, 1928, and 1929 as part of the Scientific Survey of Puerto Rico and the Virgin Islands. Hagelstein would spend six months indexing his growing collection of diatom slides after these surveys were completed. Although the Great Depression imposed delays, he was also eventually able to finish a manuscript by 1935 and publish a final report on the Puerto Rican and Virgin Island specimens in 1939.

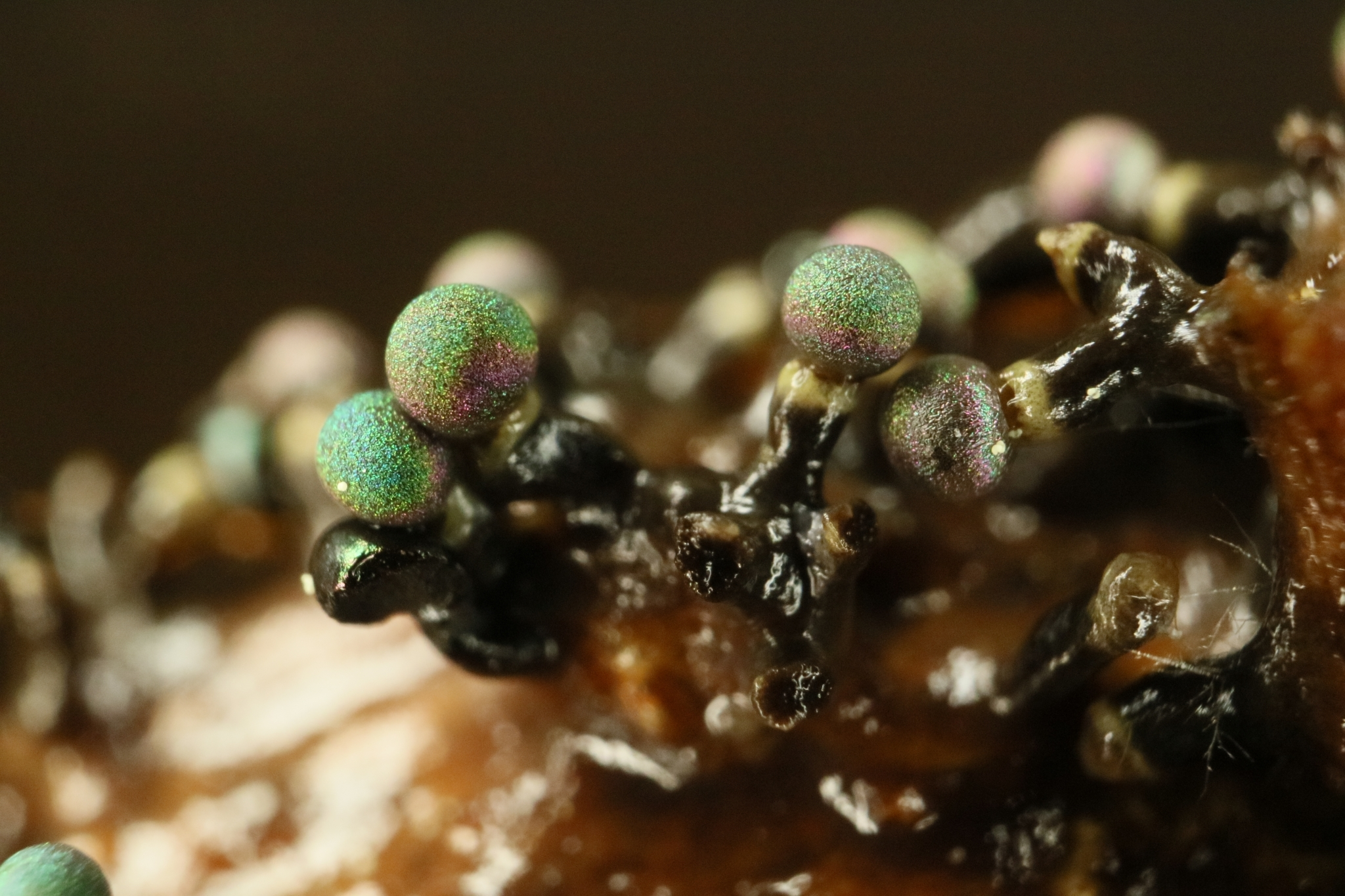
Hagelstein was the first to describe the slime mold genus Elaeomyxa, a species of which is pictured here – photo by Peta McDonald

As he concluded his work on diatoms, Hagelstein's focus shifted to the myxomycetes—a type of slime mold—of Long Island, Puerto Rico, and other islands. His preliminary interest in the myxomycetes had led him to publish some short academic papers in 1927, one of which described a new species. He became Honorary Curator of Myxomycetes at the New York Botanical Garden from 1930 until his death in 1945, and in 1936 the New York State Museum asked him to survey and verify species identities for its myxomycete collection.

Hagelstein made specimen collection trips to numerous sites from Canada to Florida, as well as to the islands of the West Indies, but concentrated primarily on collecting in Long Island and Pennsylvania. He also spent many working hours in both his home laboratory and at the New York Botanical Garden. Fellow collector Joseph H. Rispaud—an architect and builder with a keen eye for rare and unusual species—frequently joined Hagelstein on field outings under the auspices of the Torrey Botanical Club and the New York Microscopical Society, and shared Hagelstein's goal of actively engaging amateur and student microscopists in work on the myxomycetes. Over the course of his career, Hagelstein was committed to making both his diatom and myxomycetes specimens and notes available to students and amateur microscopists. As part of his outreach efforts, he frequently led field trips for members of the New York Botanical Garden.

Hagelstein had was also a curator for the New York Botanical Garden. He kept detailed records of the collection, including meticulous microscopical records of myxomycetes sporangia and spores. He carried out complete surveys of the myxomycetes collection on multiple occasions, and personally labeled, organized, and indexed the collection's specimens. He was also the unofficial curator of the botanical garden's microscopic devices.

== Contributions ==
Over the course of his career, Hagelstein named new species and devoted much time to taxonomic work. He helped to expand the understanding of the biology of myxomycetes, which were considered puzzling "animal-plant" organisms in the late 1930s and early 1940s. He contributed an extensive photomicrography record to the New York Botanical Garden collection and regularly published his findings to advance the knowledge of his specialized field. In addition to numerous academic journal articles, he published the following:

- "Critical Study of the Mycetozoa of Long Island" (1936)
- "Diatomaceae of Porto Rico and the Virgin Islands" (1939)
- The Mycetozoa of North America (1944)

During Hagelstein's tenure at the New York Botanical Garden, the myxomycete collection grew from 2,000 to over 13,000 specimens, with over 4,000 contributed by Hagelstein himself. On January 11, 1941, the Cryptogamic Herbarium of the New York Botanical Garden was officially opened, and included a special room devoted to Hagelstein's diatom and myxomycetes collections.

== Death ==
Hagelstein died in Mineoloa, New York, on October 20, 1945. After his death, the New York Botanical Garden Library received and continues to maintain a collection, entitled "The Robert Hagelstein Records, 1904–1945", of his personal correspondence, notebooks, manuscripts, photographs, and publications.

== Scientific affiliations ==
Hagelstein belonged to the following scientific associations and entities during his career:

- New York Academy of Sciences
- American Microscopical Society
- Royal Microscopical Society
- Queckett Microscopical Club of England
- The Mycological Society of America
- Torrey Botanical Club
- New York Botanical Garden

== Genera and species ==
The following genera and species were described by Hagelstein:

- Badhamia dearnessii, named for Dr. John Dearness, past president of the Mycological Society of America, and later determined to be a synonym of Badhamia goniospora Meyl.
- Comatricha extendens
- Cribraria laxa
- Elaeomyxa
- Paradiachea rispaudii, originally Comatricha rispaudii, named for Hagelstein's field collection colleague Joseph Rispaud, who first collected this species
