= Marie Leonore Farr =

Austrian-born U.S. mycologist

- Born: Marie Lenore Ehrmann; September 6, 1927; Vienna, Austria
- Died: May 13, 2014 (aged 86)
- Education: Michigan State University (BSc, MSc); University of Iowa (PhD)
- Scientific career
- Thesis: Taxonomic studies on Myxomycetes (1957)
- Author abbrev. (botany): M.L.Farr, M.L. Farr

Marie Leonore Farr (1927–2014), known as Lennie Farr, was an American mycologist. She was the first woman to be elected president of the Mycological Society of America.

== Early life and education ==
Marie Lenore Ehrmann was born in Vienna, Austria on September 6, 1927. She migrated to the United States with her family and completed her secondary education at Central High School in Detroit, Michigan in 1945.

Farr graduated from Michigan State University with a BSc and then MSc in botany. At the University of Iowa she was awarded a PhD in 1957, for her thesis "Taxonomic studies on Myxomycetes".

== Career ==
Farr worked at a number of universities both in the United States and elsewhere, including Washington State College, Smith College, the Institute of Jamaica and Federal University of Pernambuco in Brazil. She then joined the Mycology Laboratory at the United States Department of Agriculture in Beltsville, Maryland. She collaborated locally and internationally in the identification of slime molds and ascomycetes.

Farr was the first woman to be elected president of the Mycological Society of America, serving from 1980 to 1981. She had earlier twice been vice president, in 1972–1973 and 1978–1979. Her presidency coincided with the Society's golden anniversary which she celebrated by compiling and presenting a detailed history of the society, "Developmental Studies on the MSA".

The standard author abbreviation M.L.Farr is used to indicate this person as the author when citing a botanical name. Her author abbreviation is listed as M. L. Farr in Harvard University's Index of Botanists.

== Selected works ==
- Farr, Marie L.; Horner, Harry T. (1968), Fungi on Selaginella, J. Cramer
- Farr, Marie L. (1973), An annotated list of Spegazzini's fungus taxa, Cramer, ISBN 978-3-7682-0916-8
- Farr, Marie L. (1976), Myxomycetes, Published for Organization for Flora Neotropica by the New York Botanical Garden, ISBN 978-0-89327-009-4
- Farr, Marie L. (1981), How to know the true slime molds, W.C. Brown Co, ISBN 978-0-697-04779-3
- Martin, G. W.; Farr, Marie L.; Alexopoulos, Constantine John (1983), The genera of Myxomycetes, University of Iowa Press, ISBN 978-0-87745-124-2

== Published names ==
Farr published approximately 100 taxa (advanced search at MycoBank). See also taxa named by Marie Leonore Farr.
