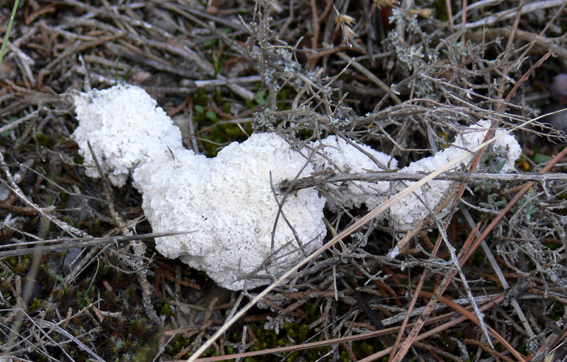
- Mucilago crustacea

Scientific classification
- Domain: Eukaryota
- Clade: Amorphea
- Phylum: Amoebozoa
- Class: Myxogastria
- Order: Physarales
- Family: Didymiaceae; Rostaf. ex Cooke

= Didymiaceae =

Family of slime moulds

Didymiaceae is a family of plasmodial slime molds in the order Physarales.

== Genera ==
The family contains the following four genera:

- Diderma
- Didymium
- Lepidoderma
- Mucilago
