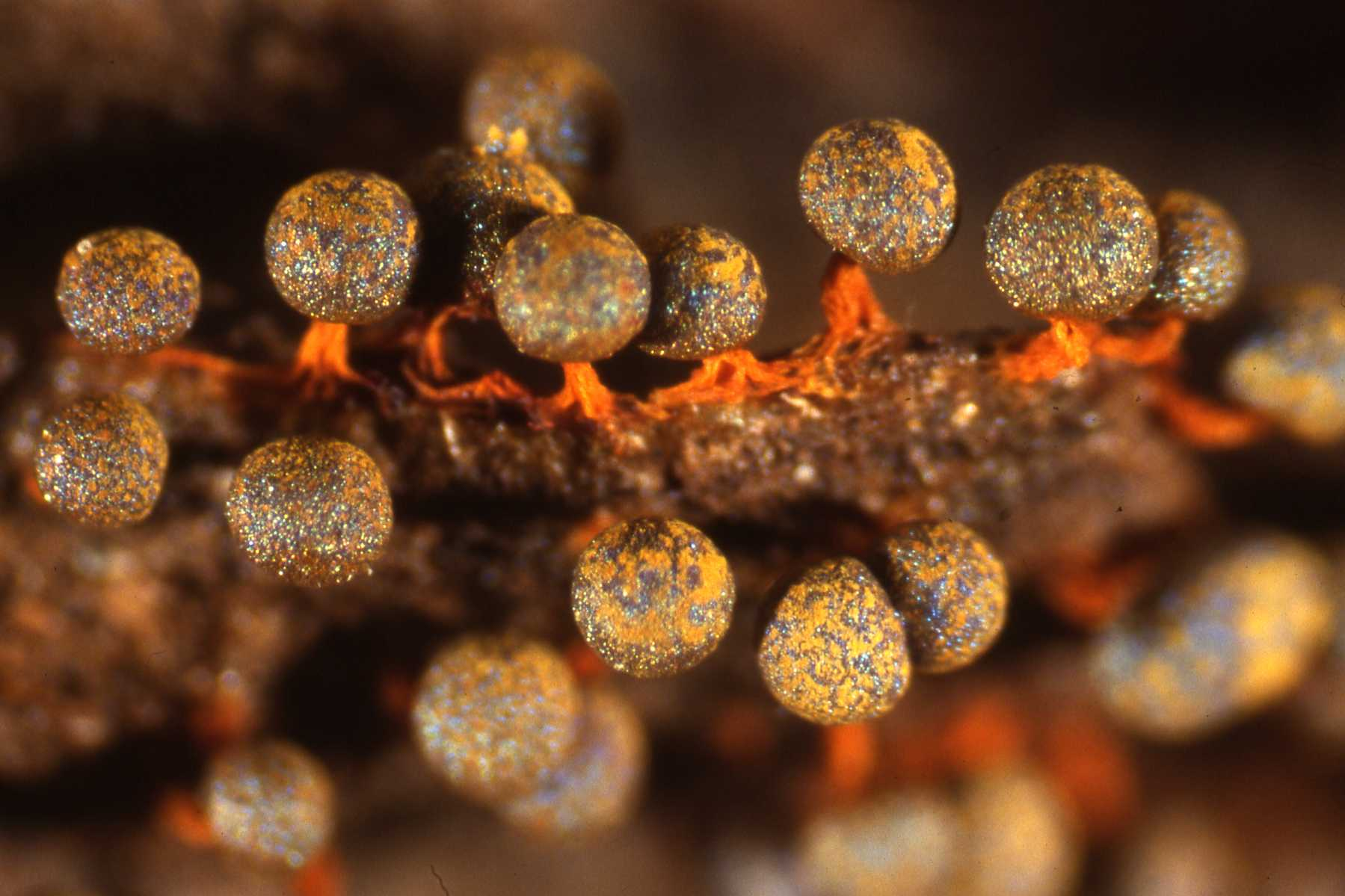
- Physarum psittacinum

Scientific classification
- Domain: Eukaryota
- Phylum: Amoebozoa
- Class: Myxogastria
- Order: Physarales; T.Macbr., 1922

Families
- Didymiaceae; Lamprodermataceae; Physaraceae

= Physarales =

Order of slime moulds

Physarales is an order of Amoebozoa in the class Myxomycetes. It contains three families, the Didymiaceae, the Lamprodermataceae, and the Physaraceae. Physarales was circumscribed by Thomas Huston Macbride and published in 1922.

== Taxonomy ==
There is evidence of an undescribed family within Physarales that bridges Didymiaceae and Lamprodermataceae, which contains the monotypic genus Tasmaniomyxa.
