= Fauna of the Australian Capital Territory =

Native animals of the Australian Capital Territory

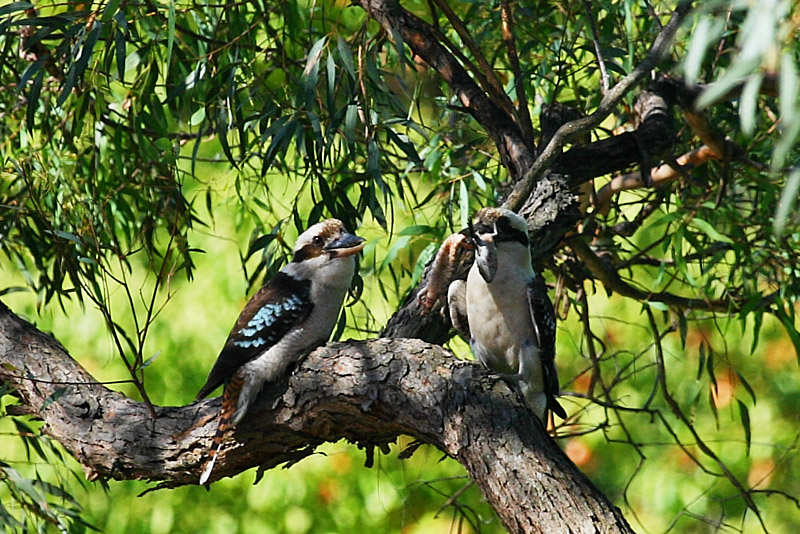
Kookaburras with lizard prey

The fauna of the Australian Capital Territory (ACT) includes representatives from most major Australian animal groups.

== Crustaceans ==
The ACT has five species of freshwater crayfish in its rivers. The Murray River crayfish has an ornate spiny abdomen with four rows of spines, and two large white claws. Males have larger claws than females, and females have a fatter abdomen. The thorax has two rows of small spines. It can grow its carapace to 150 mm long. It is found in the Murrumbidgee, Cotter and Paddys Rivers, but has been exterminated by overfishing and heavy metal poisoning in the Molonglo River. A red crayfish Euastacus nobilis crassus is found in the swamps on Mount Franklin and Mount Gingera. The 5 cm long Engaeus parvulus produces a mound of dirt around the entrance of its burrow, which has a subterranean chamber more than 30 cm in diameter, and has its own pool of water at the base. Small pools of water hold the tiny Daphnia, copepods and ostracods.

Slaters (Oniscidea) are terrestrial crustaceans. Armadillidium vulgare is frequent in gardens, coloured metallic grey, and rolls up into perfect balls. Porcellio scaber and Porcellio laevis have also been introduced, and can be found in Canberra gardens.

== Onychophora ==
Onychophorans, often known as velvet worms, are found in the alpine areas and under logs in sclerophyll forest.

== Nematodes ==
Sreinernema bibionis is found in soil in the ACT.

== Protozoa ==
The Census of the Plants of the Australian Capital Territory lists these genera of protozoan slime moulds: Arcyria, Badhamia, Ceratiomyxa, Comatricha, Craterium, Cribraria, Diachea, Diderma, Didymium, Fuligo, Lamproderma, Leocarpus, Lycogala, Physarum, Reticularia, Stemonitis, Stemonitopsis, Trichia, and Tubulifera as present in the Australian Capital Territory.

Stentor amethystinus has been documented in the ACT.

== Insects ==
There are more than 200 species of insects in the ACT, though they have been poorly studied. The most famous is the bogong moth, which aestivates in the Brindabella Ranges above 1300 m. It migrates through the territory in October and March when it is attracted in huge numbers by bright lights in the city, sometimes creating a major nuisance. Aborigines used to visit the mountains in summer to gorge on the fat-rich aestivating moths.

There are 47 species of acridoid grasshoppers in the ACT. Bermius brachycerus is found in reed beds alongside streams and rivers. Urnisa guttulosa is found on dry sand banks next to the Murrumbidgee and its tributaries. The flightless Perunga grasshopper, Keys matchstick grasshopper and the mouthless golden sun moth are vulnerable or endangered. Heterojapyx evansi is a primitive insect that lives in leaf litter in mountain forests.

Approximately 30 species of termite inhabit the ACT. Nasutitermes exitiosus builds mounds and inhabits eucalypt woodland. Coptotermes frenchi infests living trees. These two species, along with Coptotermes acinaciformis, are the three most damaging species to human structures in the territory. Coptotermes lacteus, Porotermes adamsoni, and Heterotermes ferox are all these wood-eating termites can eat timber constructions, though typically regarded as lesser pests to the three species listed above. The Atlas of Living Australia also has records in the ACT for Amitermes neogermanus, Anitermes exitiosus, Amitermes xylophagus, Nasutitermes dixoni, Nasutitermes exitiosus, and Nasutitermes fumigatus.

Several species of ladybird beetle live in the Canberra region. Chaetolotis amy is a glossy black colour with a metallic bluish green sheen. Adam Slipinski auctioned off the naming rights to this beetle in 2003 to raise money in support of the Canberra bushfires of 2003. Amy Meldrum's father bought the rights and named it after her. Other species listed from the ACT include Bucolus fourneti, Cryptolaemus montrouzieri, Rhyzobius sp., and Scymnodes sp..

The tortoise beetle Paropsis atomaria eats eucalyptus leaves.

=== Pests and introductions ===
Introduced insects have become pests. The green vegetable bug, shaped like a shield, dark green and 12 mm long, attacks tomatoes and beans. The green caterpillars of cabbage white butterflies eat brassicas. The codling moth caterpillar eats apples and pears. European earwigs eat leaves and petals. Fermentation flies eat rotting fruit. The Queensland fruit fly can be active in Canberra in late summer, eating apples, stone fruit, tomatoes and capsicums. Mandatory controls apply to infestations. Mealybugs have white hairs covered with a mealy coating. They are up to 8 mm across and suck sap from many plants, especially indoor plants. The pear slug or cherry slug is a sawfly larva. The larvae cover themselves with dark glossy slime to make themselves unpalatable. They skeletonize the leaves of cherry, pear, plum or hawthorn trees.

Scale insects suck sap from plants, are stationary and covered by a flattened disk. The black scale is the most common nuisance; it secretes a white manna, which frequently grows a black mould and attracts ants. The San Jose scale is a tiny grey dot that attacks trees. Plague thrips feed in flowers causing petals to brown. The greenhouse whitefly is a small aphid with white wings that attacks weeds and broadleaf vegetables. The European wasp has made an appearance in the 21st century. Other introduced insects include useful ones such as honeybees, dung beetles, and parasitic wasps. Bees however can become a nuisance, and there are feral swarms.

The caterpillars of a native butterfly, the citrus butterfly, eat citrus leaves. The large adults have colourful wings.

The CSIRO has its entomology division in Canberra and houses a large insect collection.

== Arachnids ==
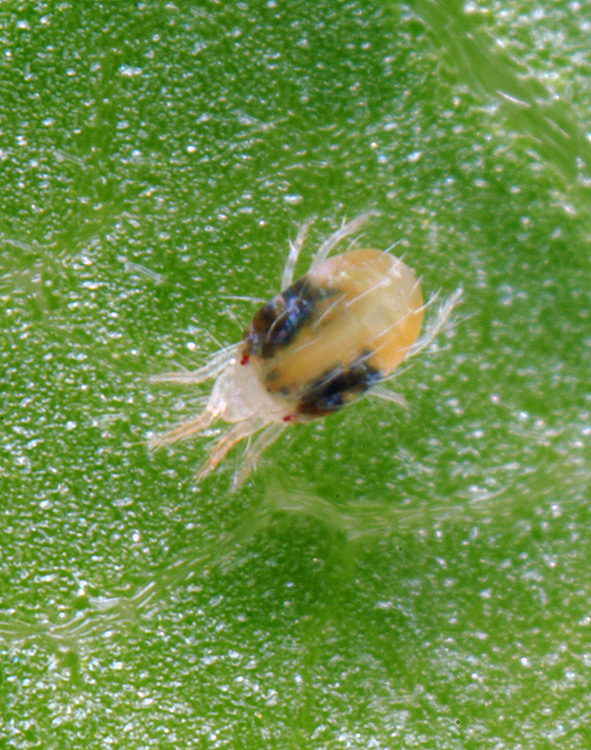
Red spider mite

Introduced arachnids include the red spider mite which sucks sap from plants and is considered a pest; attempts are being to control it with another mite Phytoseiulus persimilis. The redback spider and white-tailed spider are feared by some people.

Scorpions include Cercophonius squama, Lychas marmoreus (little marbled scorpion), Lychas variatus (marbled scorpion), and Urodacus manicatus (black rock scorpion).

== Worms ==
Rob Blakemore has identified the following exotic earthworms in the ACT:

- Aporrectodea caliginosa
- Aporrectodea trapezoides
- Eisenia fetida
- Eisenia (=Aporrectodea) rosea
- Lumbricus rubellus
- Octolasion cyaneum
- Microscolex dubius
- Microscolex phosphoreus
- Perionyx excavatus
- Amynthas rodericensis

== Molluscs ==
The freshwater clam Corbicula australis (little basket shell) is found in rivers in the ACT. Other terrestrial gastropods are Oxychilus draparnaudi (Draparnaud's glass snail), Oxychilus alliarius (garlic glass-snail), Paralaoma caputspinulae (prickle pinhead snail) Prietocella barbara (small pointed snail), Cochlicopa lubrica (slippery little pillar snail), Diphyoropa saturni (Sydney copper pinwheel snail), Elsothera funerea (Grim Reaper pinwheel snail), Paralaoma gelida (Snowy Mountains pinhead snail). Austrorhytida capillacea is found in the Tidbinbilla Nature Reserve. Helicarion cuvieri is found near Bendora Dam. Cornu aspersum (garden snail) occurs in Canberra and is a common garden pest. Another Helix, Helix aperta is also found in ACT. Yet more Pulmonata species in the ACT include Austrorhytida glaciamans (Koscuiszko carnivorous snail), Dentherona (Dentherona) illustra, Gyraulus (Pygmanisus) scottianus, Isidorella newcombi, Oxychilus cellarius (cellar glass-snail), and Trocholaoma ninguicola.

Freshwater snails include Physa acuta found at the Point Hut Crossing, and Glyptophysa gibbosa found on the Cotter River.

Slugs in the ACT include the Helicarion mastersi (royal semi-slug), Deroceras reticulatum (grey field slug), and Lehmannia nyctelia (striped field slug).

== Fish ==
Introduced fish species have pushed out the native species from most of the ACT rivers. Introduced fish are carp, brown trout, rainbow trout, redfin perch, mosquitofish and dojo loach. Angling is a popular sport in the ACT and many of these have spread due to illegal introductions and their illegal use as live bait.

Well known native fish include the Murray cod and golden perch. Lesser known fish are the two-spined blackfish, which survives in the Cotter catchment, the trout cod, which is locally extinct but being restocked, silver perch, which is near local extinction, Macquarie perch, which is endangered but still survives in the Cotter River, and the mountain galaxias, an increasingly threatened small fish now only found in small streams free of trout.

== Amphibians ==
In the dry woodland and sclerophyll forest the most frequent frogs are the pobblebonk and common eastern froglet. At higher altitudes in wet sclerophyll forest Bibron's toadlet predominates. The brown tree frog can also be found. The northern corroboree frog has a dramatic yellow and black striped appearance, but is very rare; a breeding program is trying to save it from extinction. It lives in high, boggy country in the ACT and also in the Fiery Range in New South Wales.

== Reptiles ==
The most common snake in the ACT is the eastern brown snake. The red-bellied black snake is found near rivers and can swim well. Those in the Gudgenby River do not have a red belly. Three other species of snake are occasionally found in the ACT: the Highlands copperhead, tiger snake, nocturnal black headed snake, death adder, the high altitude white-lipped snake, the uncommon common bandy-bandy snake and the blind blackish blind snake.

Lizards in the ACT include the bearded dragon, mountain dragon, and the blue-tongue. The water dragon can grow up to a metre in length. The eastern stone gecko is found under rocks in the highlands. Goannas are rare, as are the striped legless lizard in tussocky grassland, the pink-tailed worm-lizard, and the grassland earless dragon.

Turtles include eastern long-necked turtle and the short-necked Macquarie turtle.

== Birds ==
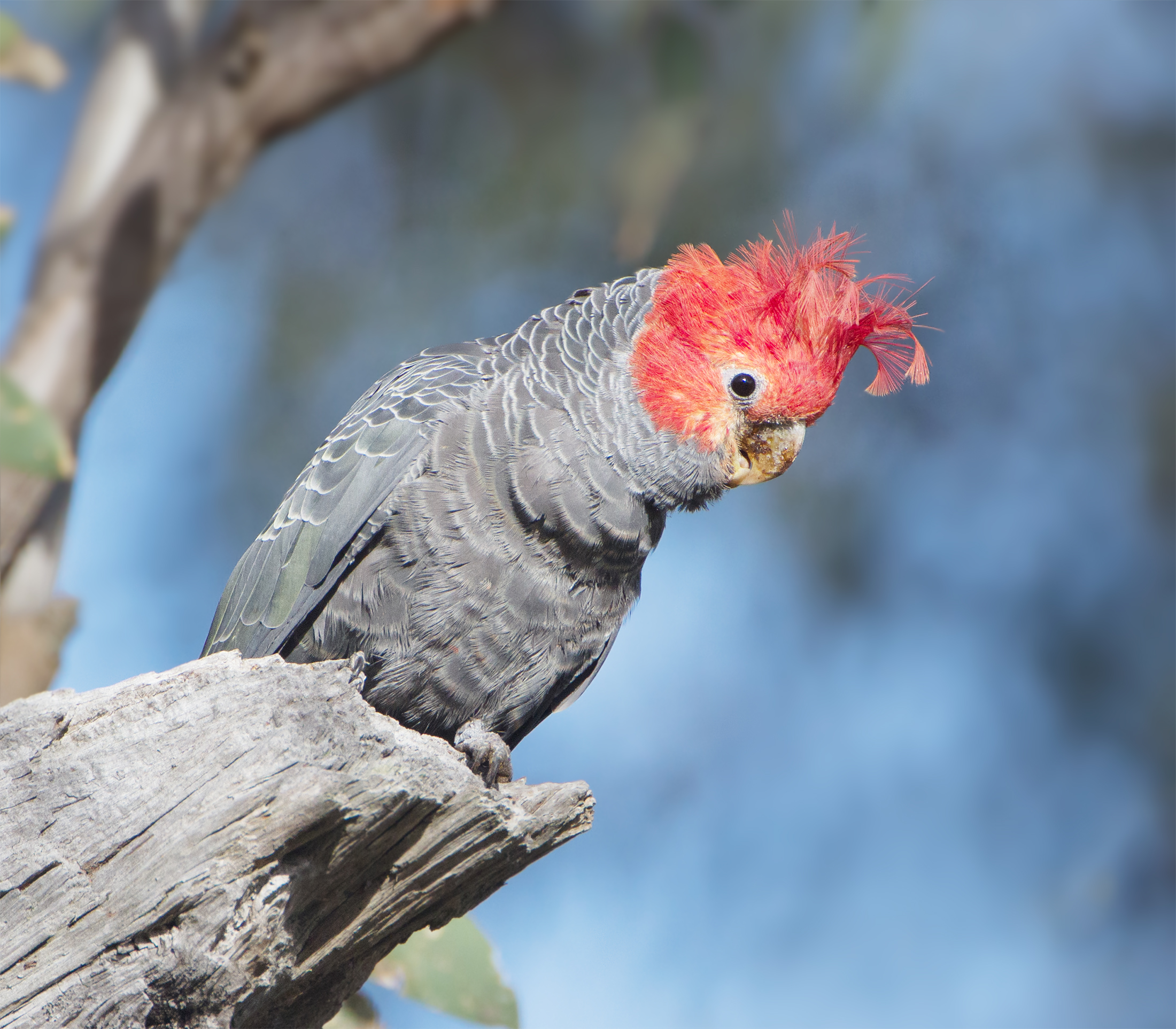
A gang-gang cockatoo photographed in the ACT

At least 290 species of birds have been recorded by the Canberra Ornithologists Group. The gang-gang cockatoo is the bird emblem of the ACT. Some birds migrate through the ACT, whereas others breed as residents. The deliberately introduced common myna is an environmental pest that is firmly established in the urban area.

== Mammals ==
The mammals are a subset of the southern coastal Australian fauna.

=== Monotremes ===
The short-beaked echidna is found throughout the territory. The platypus occurs in pools in the rivers.

=== Marsupials ===
The tiger quoll is very rare. The eastern grey kangaroo reaches the highest population densities anywhere in ACT grasslands and is the animal most often killed on the roads. The swamp wallaby is common in the ranges and persists in lowland reserves containing wooded areas with a shrub layer. The brush-tailed rock-wallaby was last confirmed in 1959 and is now considered to be extinct. Wallaroos are increasing their distribution through the mountain areas and lowland reserves but are common in only two or three sites. The common brushtail possum is common in bushland only where foxes have been controlled, but is abundant in urban areas in spite of high fox density. The common ringtail possum is rare. The sugar glider is found in sclerophyll forest and dry woodland. The greater glider lives in higher altitude wet sclerophyll forest. The common wombat lives in the high country and along river banks, emerging from its burrow at dusk but is increasing its distribution through rural areas and lowland reserves. Koalas are rare in the ACT with the last record in the 1990s.

=== Placental mammals ===
More than half the native mammal species are placental mammals, dominated in numbers by bats, with at least 18 species. The most common bats are microbat species, including Gould's wattled bat which is frequently seen in the early evening in urban areas, and the white-striped free-tailed bat whose audible call can be heard on summer evenings. The chocolate wattled bat, little forest bat, large forest bat, southern forest bat, Gould's long-eared bat and lesser long-eared bats are all found in forest and woodland areas. There are two species of megabat: the grey-headed flying fox which has been a regular seasonal visitor to the Territory since 2003, and the little red flying fox which makes occasional visits. The rakali, or water rat, occurs in streams. The smoky mouse is a rare rodent. The dingo was extensively persecuted during early European settlement but still survives in the ACT.

=== Feral and introduced mammals ===
Introduced mammals have become a pest. As well as introduced rodents there are feral cats. Rabbits were formerly a major pest, but numbers have decreased following control measures such as warren ripping and the dissemination of rabbit haemorrhagic disease. Foxes are baited to reduce their population in rural areas. Wild horses occur in the Namadgi National Park and adjacent Kosciuszko National Park where they are called brumbies; although environmental pests, ACT residents have opposed killing them. Pigs live in the mountains and damage plants; they are controlled by hunting and poisoning. European fallow deer and wild goats occur in low numbers. Feral dogs interbreed with, and threaten the genome of, dingos; both are trapped and baited on the edge of rural properties to protect sheep.
