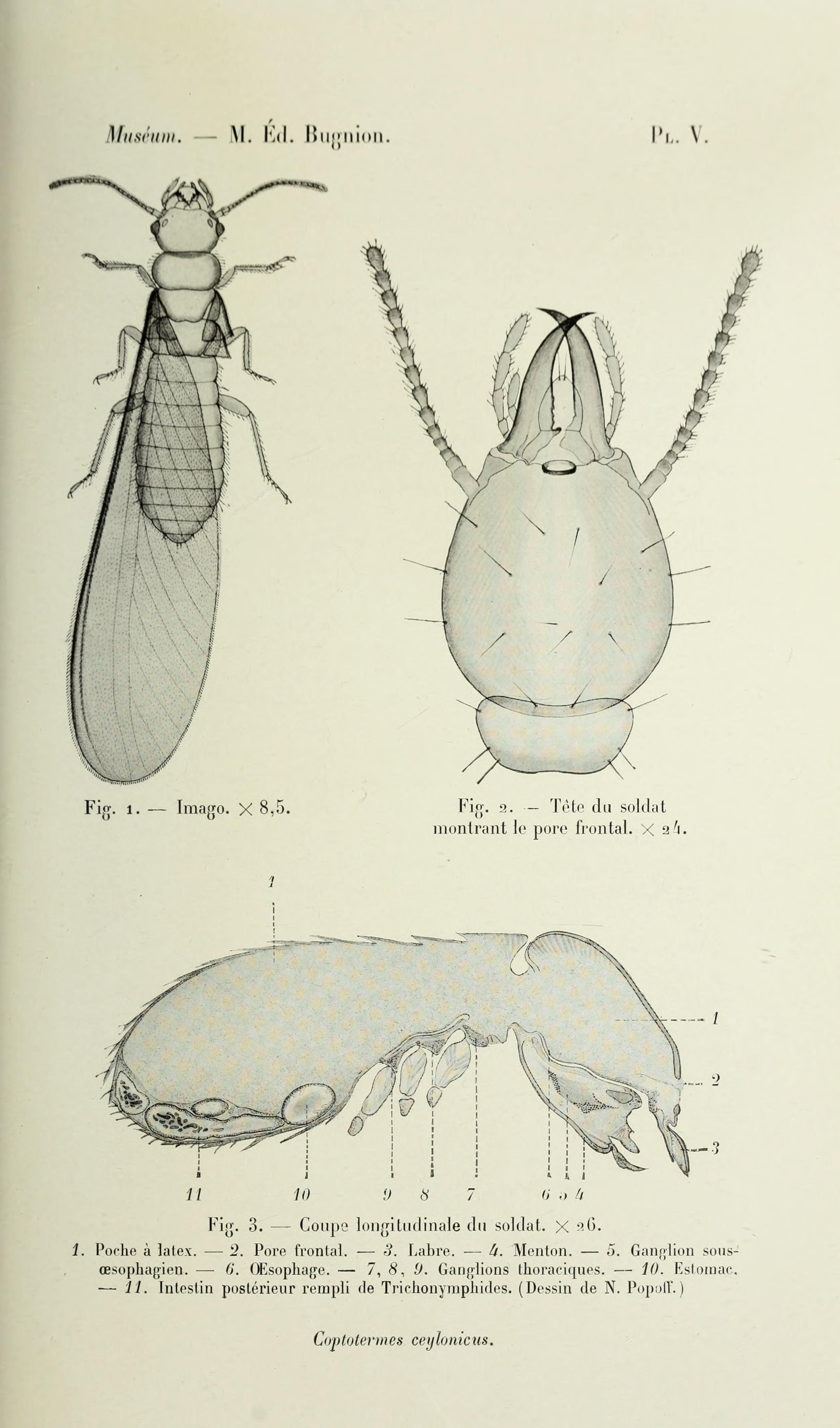

Scientific classification
- Domain: Eukaryota
- Kingdom: Animalia
- Phylum: Arthropoda
- Class: Insecta
- Order: Blattodea
- Infraorder: Isoptera
- Family: Rhinotermitidae
- Genus: Coptotermes
- Species: C. ceylonicus

Binomial name
- Coptotermes ceylonicus Holmgren, 1911

= Coptotermes ceylonicus =

Species of termite

Coptotermes ceylonicus, is a species of subterranean termite of the genus Coptotermes. It is native to India and Sri Lanka. It is a common wood destroying termites, which damage to logs, woodens structures of both natural and man-made. It is a pest of many economically valuable trees such as Hevea brasiliensis and Camellia sinensis, and also an inhabitant of Anacardium occidentale, Cocos nucifera, Ficus fergusonii, Gliricidia sepium, Grevillea robusta, Madhuca longifolia, Tamarindus indica and Theobroma cacao.

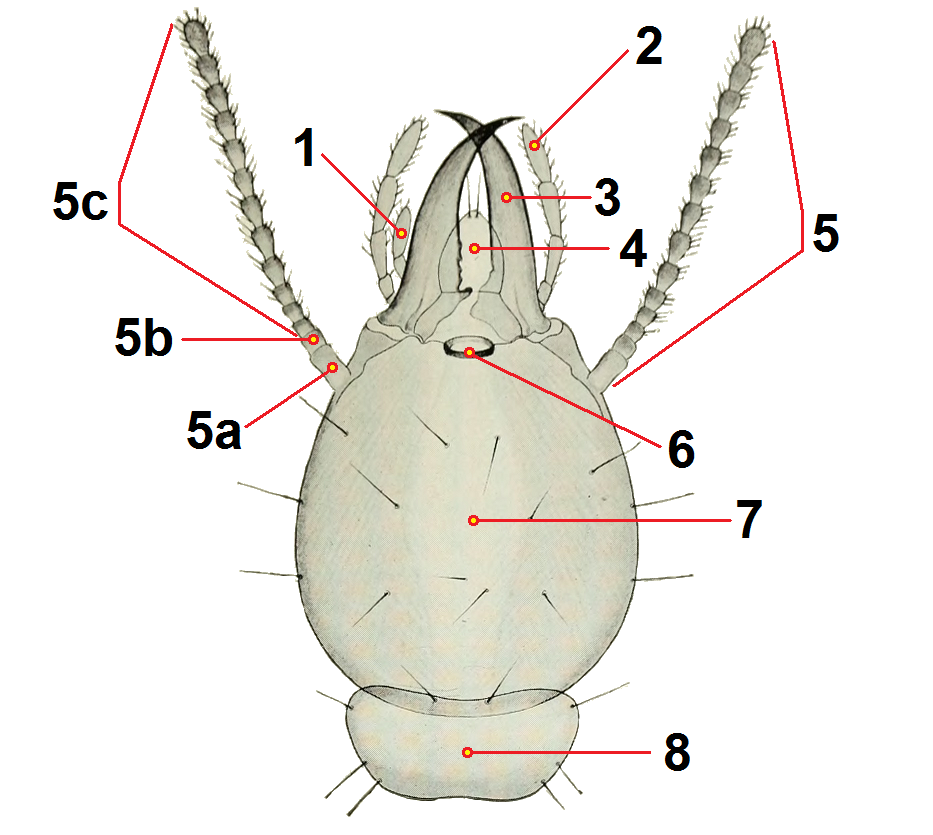
