= Coptotermes elisae =

Scientific classification
- Kingdom: Animalia
- Phylum: Arthropoda
- Clade: Pancrustacea
- Class: Insecta
- Order: Blattodea
- Infraorder: Isoptera
- Family: Heterotermitidae
- Genus: Coptotermes
- Species: C. elisae

Binomial name
- Coptotermes elisae (Desneux, 1905)

Synonyms
- Termes elisae Desneux, 1905; Coptotermes hyaloapex Holmgren, 1911; Coptotermes curvignathus

Species of termite

Coptotermes elisae, the Papuan plantation termite, is a species of termite in the family Heterotermitidae. It is native to New Guinea, Indonesia, and Southeast Asia, where it attacks and kills living trees and damages structural timbers.

== Description ==
Termites are social insects with a caste system, and individuals are either workers, soldiers, or reproductives. A C. elisae worker measures between 7.8 and 9.0 mm (0.31 and 0.35 in) in length and has a rounded head with large eyes. The pronotum is broad and both the head and it are densely hairy. The antennae have 20 to 22 flagellomeres (segments). A soldier is rather larger than a worker and has a rounded head and large incurved mandibles. Its antennae usually have 16 flagellomeres. The fontanelle, a pore gland on the forehead that secretes a milky fluid, can easily be seen from above. The pronotum is long with about 70 setae (bristles), mostly near the margins, and the mesothorax, metathorax, and abdomen are also densely bristly. These features help distinguish this species from other termites found in the same region.

== Distribution and habitat ==
C. elisae is native to the forests of New Guinea, where it is widely distributed, and is also found in New Ireland. Since it has been determined that C. curvignathus is a synonym of C. elisae, its range has been extended northwards through Indonesia and the Philippines to the Malay Peninsula, Thailand, Cambodia, and Vietnam.

== Ecology ==
C. elisae primarily attacks both young and old evergreen trees in the genus Araucaria, the klinkii (A. klinkii) and the hoop pine (A. cunninghamii), but is also known to attack other hosts such as the taun tree (Pometia pinnata), Hopea trees, the papaya (Carica papaya), and the mango (Mangifera indica) A parasitic fungus, Antennopsis gayi, is sometimes found growing on the body of C. elisiae and the rove beetle Coptophysa obesa is sometimes found living inside the termite colony.

== Damage ==
C. elisae is considered to be an extremely severe pest. The termites enter a tree through an injury to the bark and tunnel into the interior, where they eat the wood and often cause the death of the host. In plantations of hoop pine, groups of up to 20 trees may be infected and die, attacked by termites foraging from one central nest via tunnels to neighbouring trees. Trees older than 21 years seem less prone to attack. In Malaysia, C. elisae has made the establishment of plantations of certain exotic tree species very difficult, attacking every tree in some new plantations of Pinus and Araucaria. Control may be attempted by excavating the nest and removing the queen reproductive, or in new plantations, by the use of explosives.
