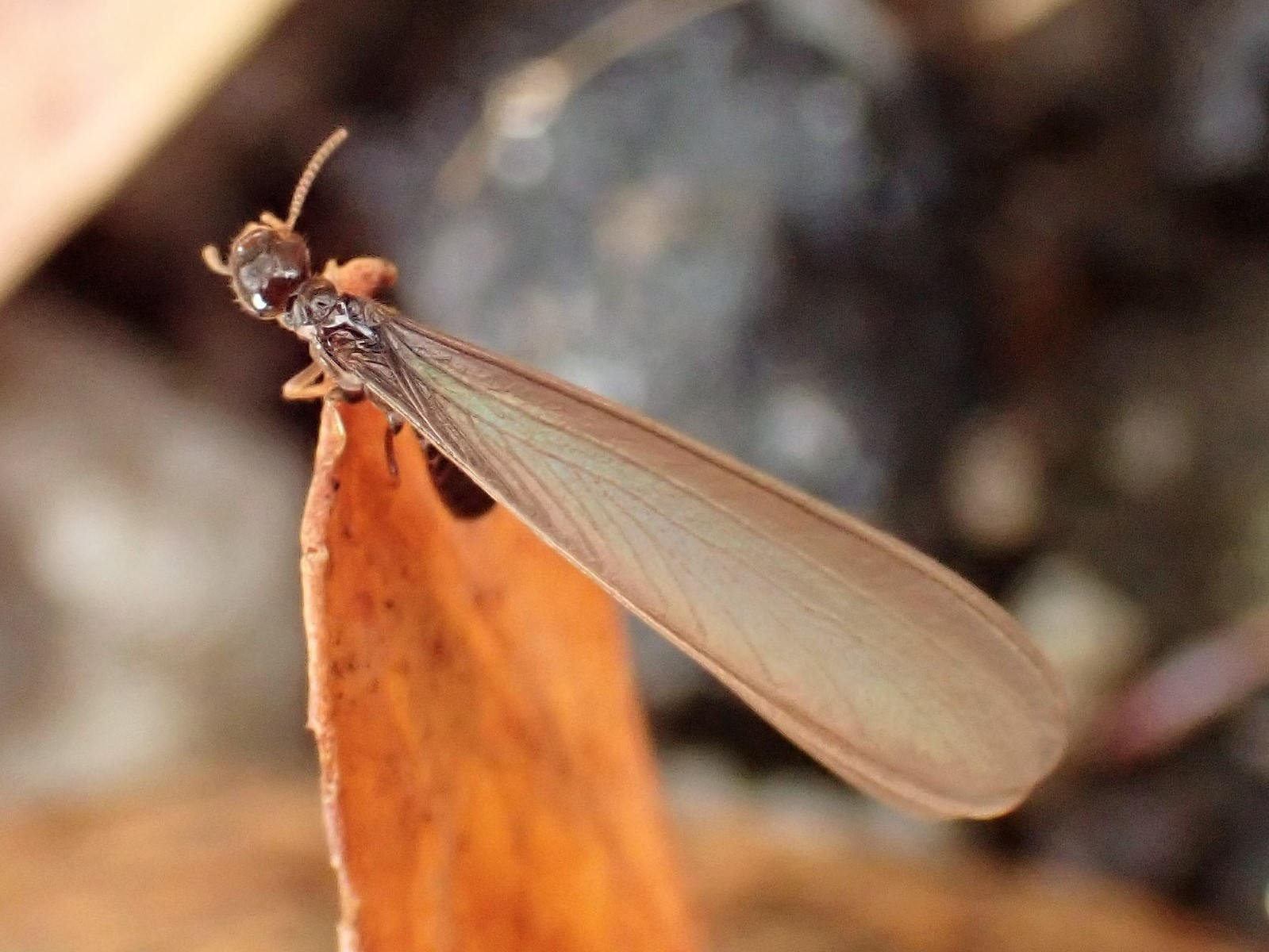

Scientific classification
- Kingdom: Animalia
- Phylum: Arthropoda
- Clade: Pancrustacea
- Class: Insecta
- Order: Blattodea
- Infraorder: Isoptera
- Family: Heterotermitidae
- Genus: Coptotermes
- Species: C. acinaciformis

Binomial name
- Coptotermes acinaciformis (Froggatt, 1898)

= Coptotermes acinaciformis =

Species of termite

Coptotermes acinaciformis is a species of subterranean termite in the family Heterotermitidae native to Australia. Termites are social insects and build a communal nest. In the case of C. acinaciformis, this is either in the root crown of a tree or underground. From this, a network of galleries extends through the nearby soil, enabling the workers to forage in the surrounding area without emerging on the surface of the ground. This termite can cause substantial damage to trees and the wooden parts of buildings.

== The colony ==
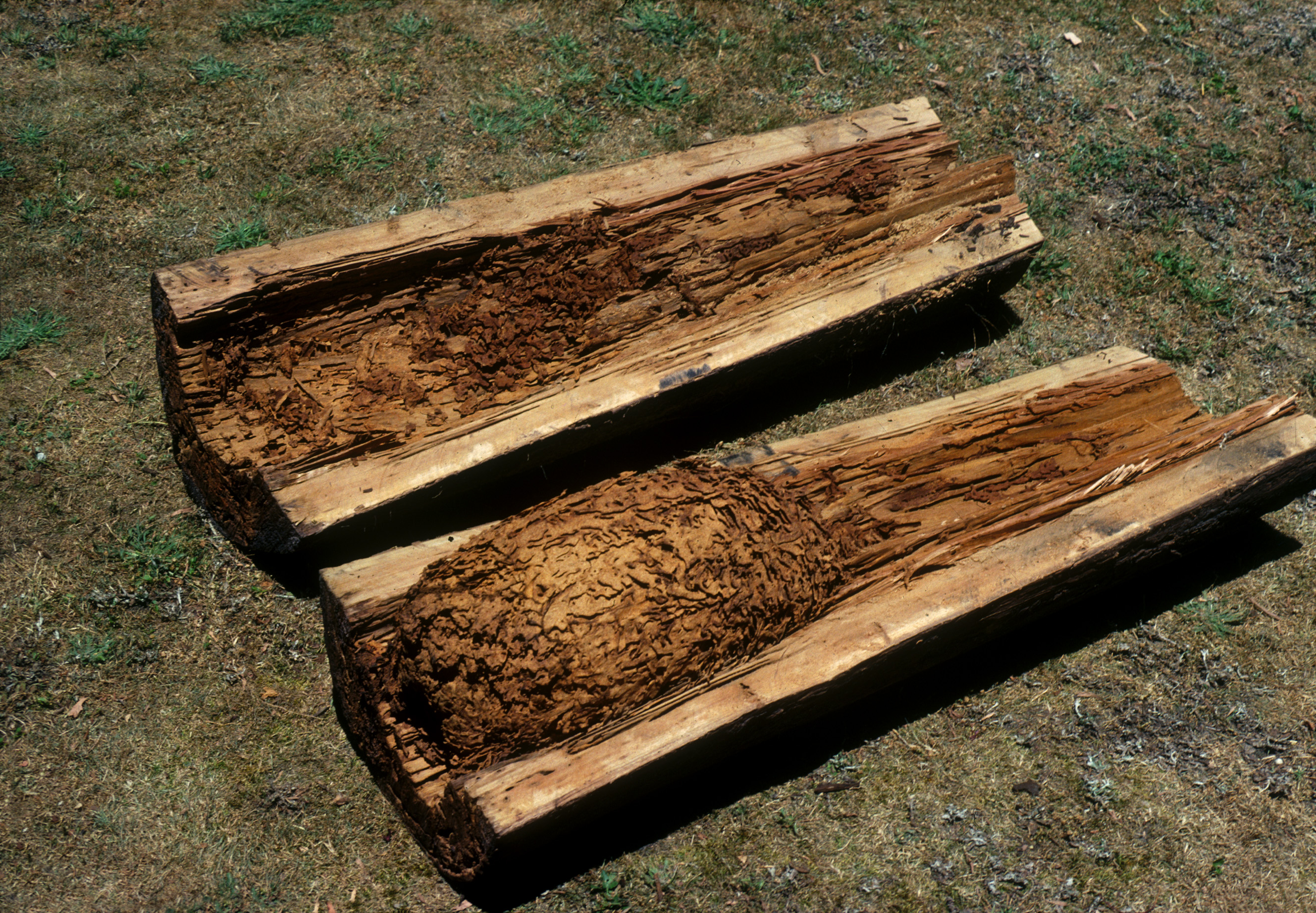
Nest of Coptotermes acinaciformis in a pole

C. acinaciformis builds its nest at the base of a tree trunk or underground, and may form a mound. Subterranean passages extend from the nest up to 50 m (160 ft) and allow the workers to access other sources of wood on which to feed. Subsidiary nests are often built in such places as the cavities in the walls of buildings, but only in places where some moisture exists, perhaps from a leaking pipe. A large colony may contain more than a million termites. Where the nest is in a living tree, a central "pipe" of material is eaten out and replaced with frass. A number of other trees in the immediate vicinity can be similarly tunnelled, invasion taking place through the living bark. This is in contrast to the initial invasion of a tree by a newly mated pair of reproductives. In the latter case, the invasion is via pre-existing damage to the trunk. Tree stumps and fallen logs in the area are also affected, and mound nests have been shown to persist even when the host trees have been eaten out. The galleries from the colony may extend over an area of 0.4 acres (0.16 ha). Another favoured nesting site is where soil has been disturbed in a building site and pieces of timber have been accidentally buried in moist soil. This sometimes happens under patios or around new buildings.

== The termites ==
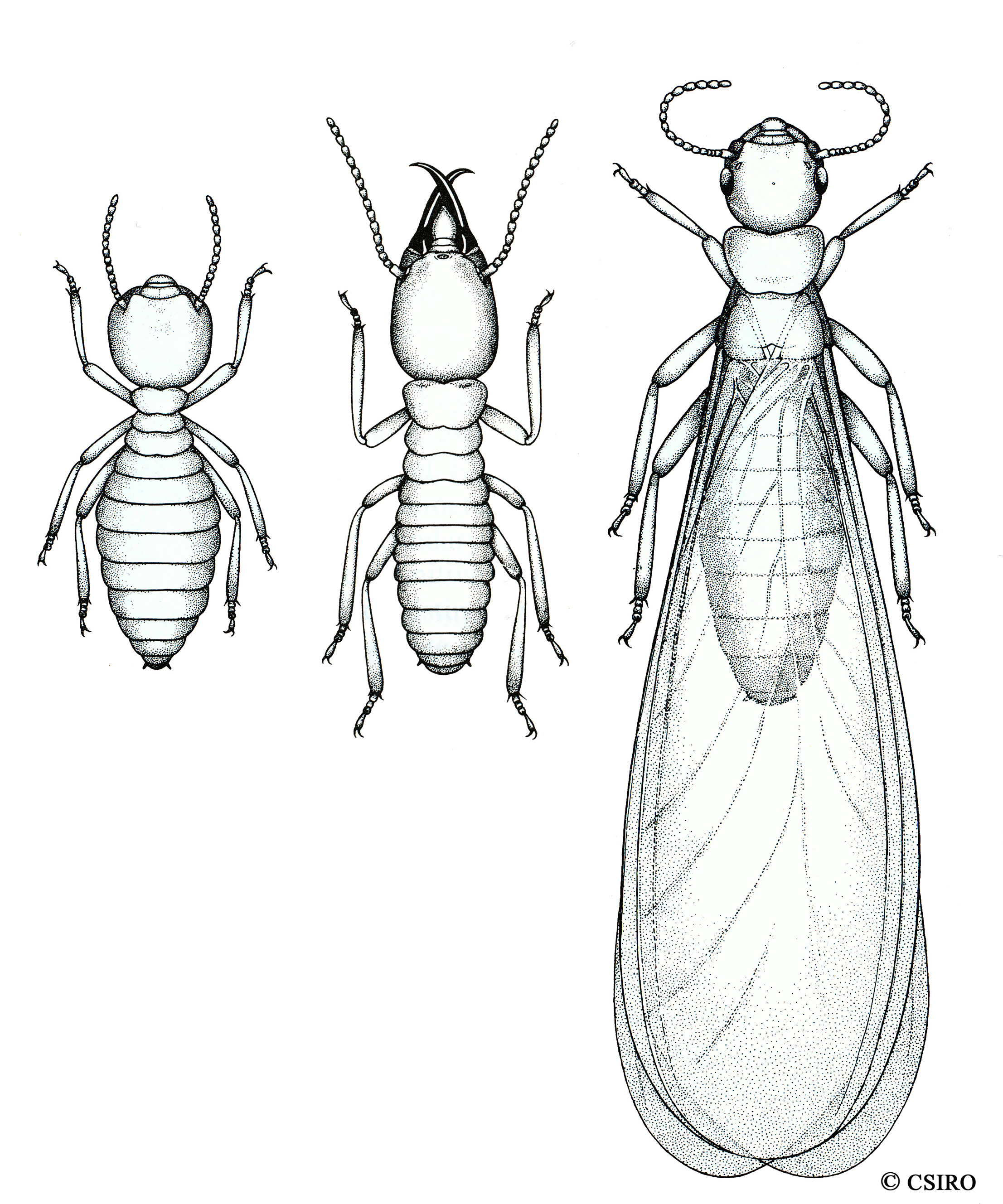
Different castes of C. acinaciformis

Several species of termite are found in Australia and they are difficult to distinguish from one another. C. acinaciformis is most likely to be confused with C. frenchi or C. lacteus. At a length of 5 to 6.5 mm (0.20 to 0.26 in), the soldiers of C. acinaciformis are slightly larger than the other two species. When viewed from above, the soldiers of C. frenchi and C. lacteus have pear-shaped heads, while the heads of C. acinaciformis soldiers are more rectangular.

Their lifecycle starts with the emergence of winged reproductives from a temporary hole in an established nest. A nuptial flight takes place, and after they have returned to the ground, they shed their wings and search for a suitable place to found their colony. This is usually a piece of rotting wood buried in moist soil or a patch of decay at the base of a tree. The first eggs laid develop into workers and only when these are mature enough to take over the care of the young can the queen concentrate on egg-laying, the thing she will do for the rest of her life. Usually, three to five years are needed before the colony is big enough to cause damage to nearby buildings and structures.

== Distribution and habitat ==
C. acinaciformis is the most widely distributed termite in Australia and occurs throughout the country with the exception of Tasmania, parts of coastal Victoria, and a few other areas with high rainfall. It is found in both rural forested areas and in urban areas where trees are near buildings.

== Research ==
Researchers have shown that when individual termites have been separated from a colony for some time and then returned to the colony, they are recognised and accepted by other members of the colony, whereas individuals from a different nest are rejected.
