= Helicarion australis =

Conservation status
- Least Concern (IUCN 2.3)

Scientific classification
- Kingdom: Animalia
- Phylum: Mollusca
- Class: Gastropoda
- Order: Stylommatophora
- Family: Helicarionidae
- Genus: Helicarion
- Species: H. australis

Binomial name
- Helicarion australis (Reeve, 1862)

Species of semislug from Australia

Helicarion australis is a species of air-breathing pulmonate land snail or semi-slug in the family Helicarionidae. This species is endemic to Australia.
