= Coptotermes gaurii =

Scientific classification
- Domain: Eukaryota
- Kingdom: Animalia
- Phylum: Arthropoda
- Class: Insecta
- Order: Blattodea
- Infraorder: Isoptera
- Genus: Coptotermes
- Species: C. gaurii

Binomial name
- Coptotermes gaurii Roonwal & Krishna, 1955

Synonyms
- Coptotermes exiguus Jepson, 1930, nomen nudum

Species of termite

Coptotermes gaurii, is a species of subterranean termite of the genus Coptotermes. It is native to South India and Sri Lanka. It is a serious pest of tea in Sri Lanka.
