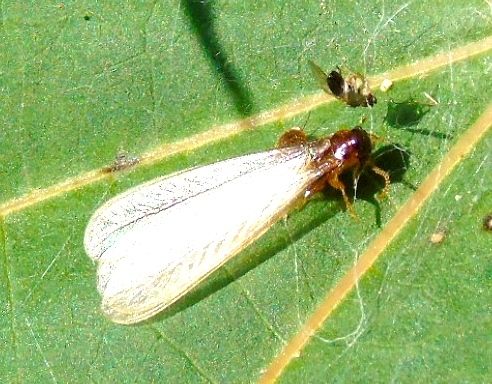

Scientific classification
- Kingdom: Animalia
- Phylum: Arthropoda
- Class: Insecta
- Order: Blattodea
- Infraorder: Isoptera
- Family: Heterotermitidae
- Genus: Coptotermes
- Species: C. gestroi

Binomial name
- Coptotermes gestroi (Wasmann, 1896)

Synonyms
- List: Termes (Coptotermes) gestroi Wasmann, 1896; Coptotermes havilandi Holmgren, 1911; Coptotermes pacificus Light, 1932; Coptotermes javanicus Kemner, 1934; Coptotermes monosetosus menglunensis Tsai, Huang and Li, 1985; Coptotermes obliquus Xia and He, 1986; Coptotermes yaxianensis Li, 1986; Coptotermes cochlearus Xia and He, 1986; Coptotermes vastator Light, 1929

= Coptotermes gestroi =

Species of termite

Coptotermes gestroi, commonly known as the Asian subterranean termite is a small species of termite that lives underground. Both this species and the Formosan subterranean termite (Coptotermes formosanus) are destructive pests native to Asia, but have spread to other parts of the world including the United States. In Asia, this species is known as the Philippine milk termite.

The termite species Coptotermes havilandi was determined by Kirton and Brown in 2003 to be identical to Coptotermes gestroi, so following the principle of priority, the older name is now used.

== Distribution ==
C. gestroi is endemic to Southeast Asia, but has spread to many other parts of the world over the course of the last century. It reached the Marquesas Islands in 1932, Mauritius in 1936, and Réunion in 1957. It reached Barbados in 1937 and spread to many islands in the West Indies. It also occurs in southern Mexico. It was discovered in Fiji in 2009.

It was found in a single house in Hawaii in 1963 and was next detected there in 1999 and again in 2000, on the island of Oahu. The species is the subject of a research project at the University of Hawaii.

In 1996, a colony was found to be infesting a church and store in Miami, Florida, and another infestation was discovered in 1999 in Key West. Further discoveries were made in 2002 and 2006 and the species appears to have become established in Broward and Miami-Dade Counties. It has also been found on some boats moored off the coast of Florida and it is thought that the termite may have arrived in Florida via this means, with sexually mature adults reaching the mainland after nuptial flights. In the West Indies, it has become established in some natural woodland habitats, but in Florida, it seems to be restricted to manmade structures, trees growing close to them, and boats. In the mainland United States, this species is likely to remain restricted to southern Florida because it is a tropical species and can only flourish with sufficient warmth.

Chouvenc & Helmick 2015 find that C. gestroi readily hybridizes with another invasive termite in Florida, C. formosanus.

== Description ==
The body of the worker termite is small, white, and translucent as are the limbs. The soldier is larger and also white, but the ovoid head, the forward-pointing mandibles, the prothorax, and the front segments of the abdomen are dark brown. Two small pale spots are on the head adjacent to the antennae. On the forehead is an opening called a fontanelle which can extrude a white defensive secretion. In appearance, C. gestroi is very similar to C. formosanus, but they can be differentiated under the microscope, with the number of hairs on the head of the soldier differing in the two species.

== Castes ==
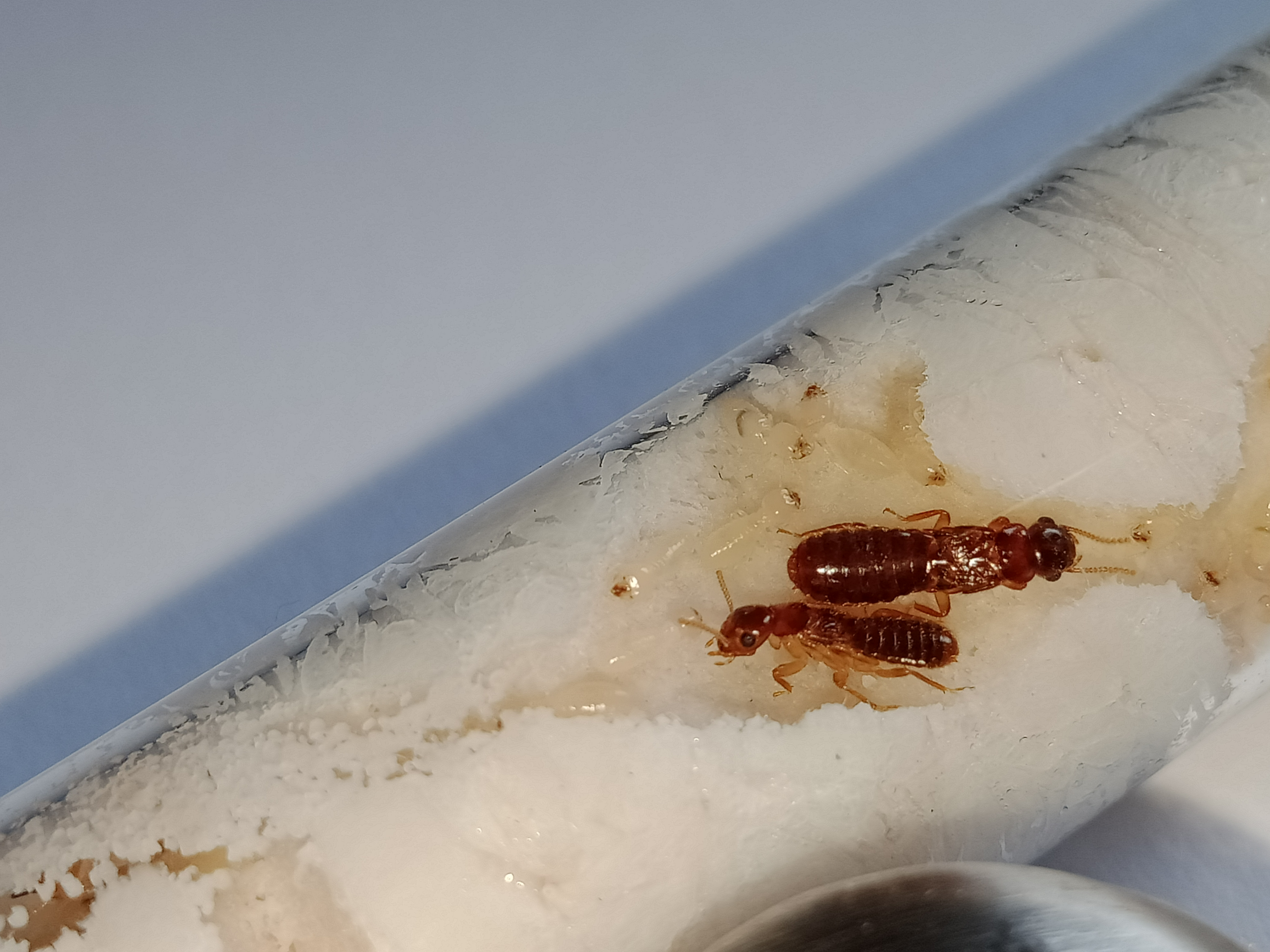
Primary Reproductive with workers

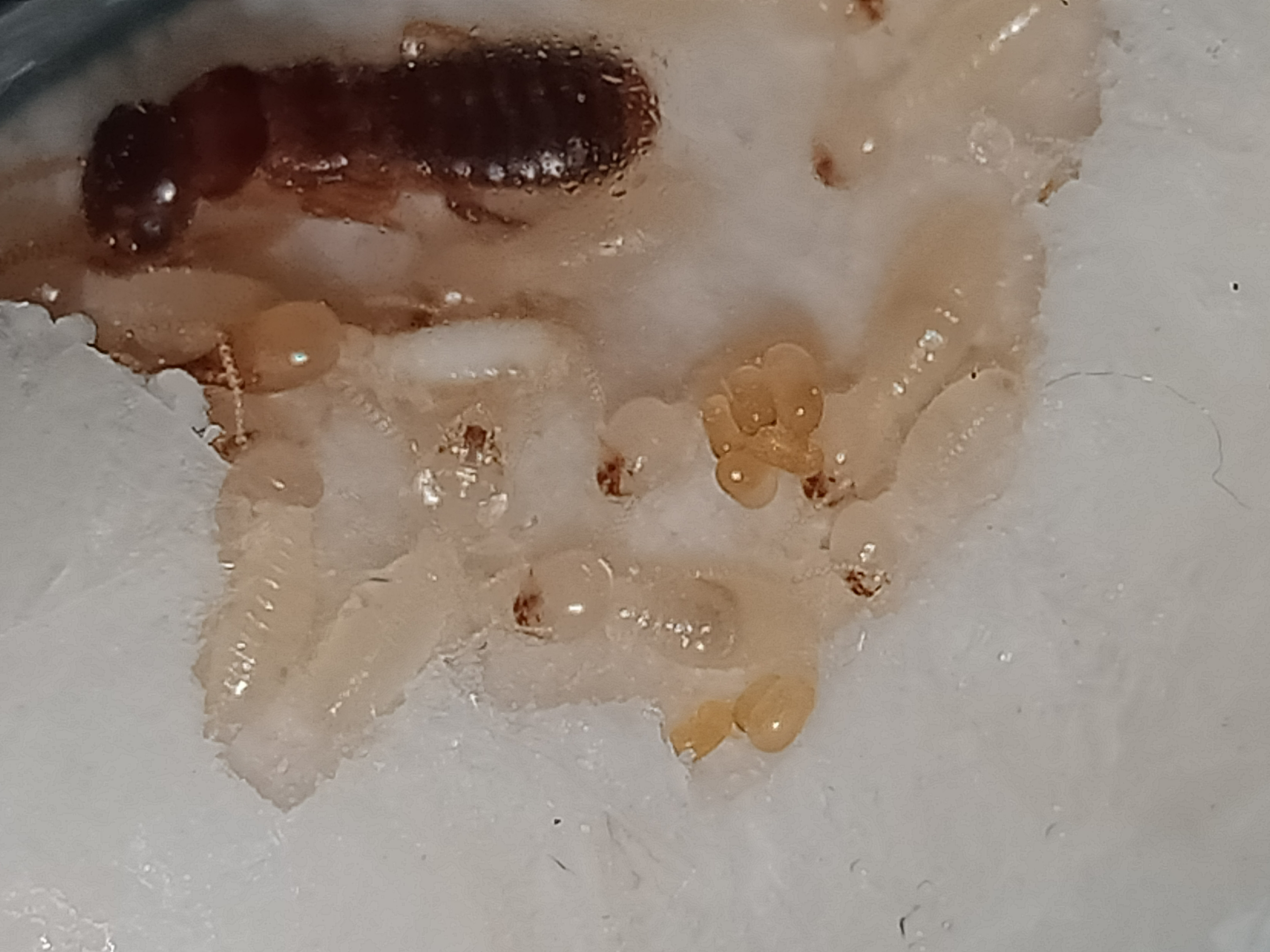
Workers among brood

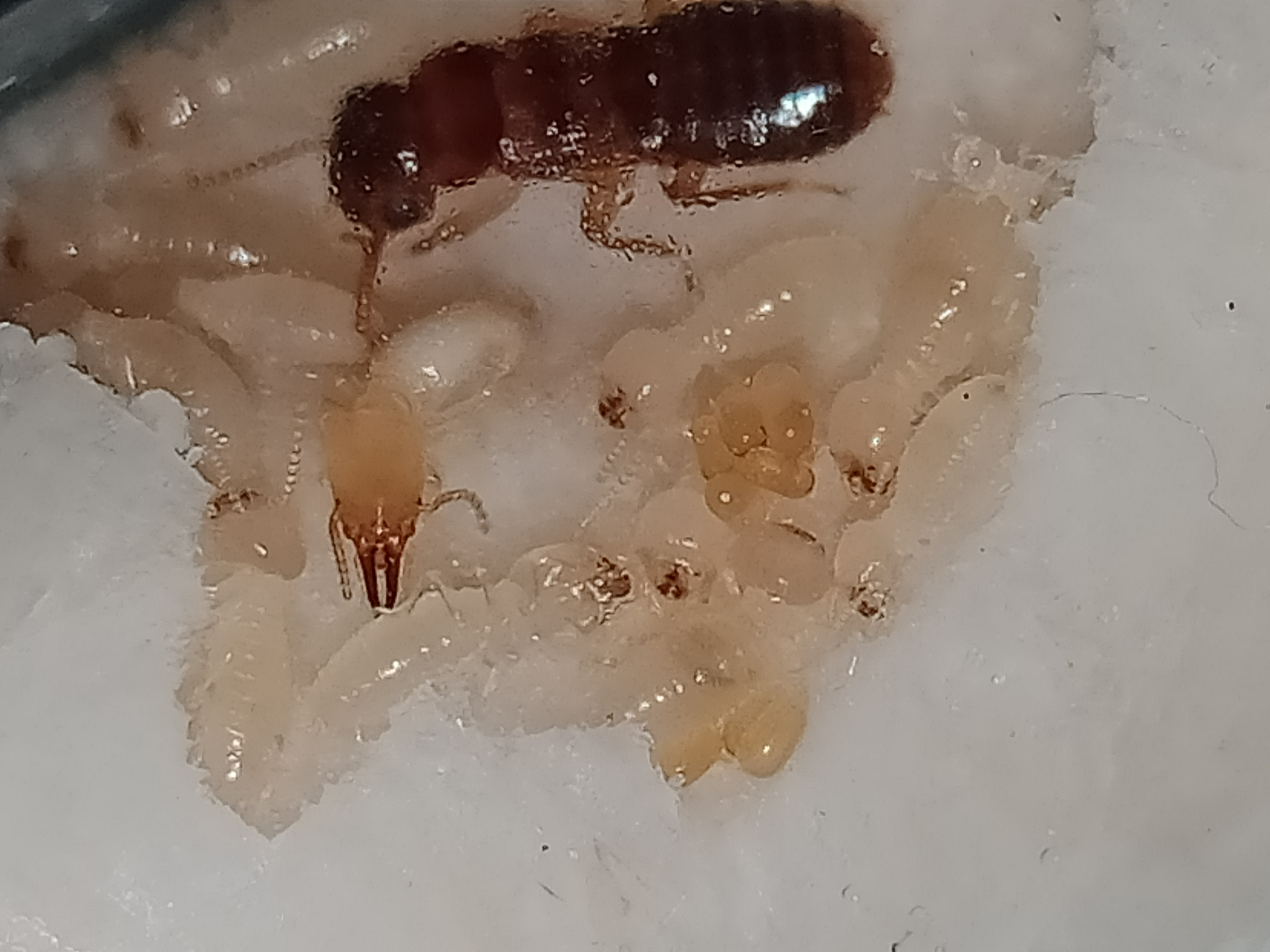
Soldier among workers

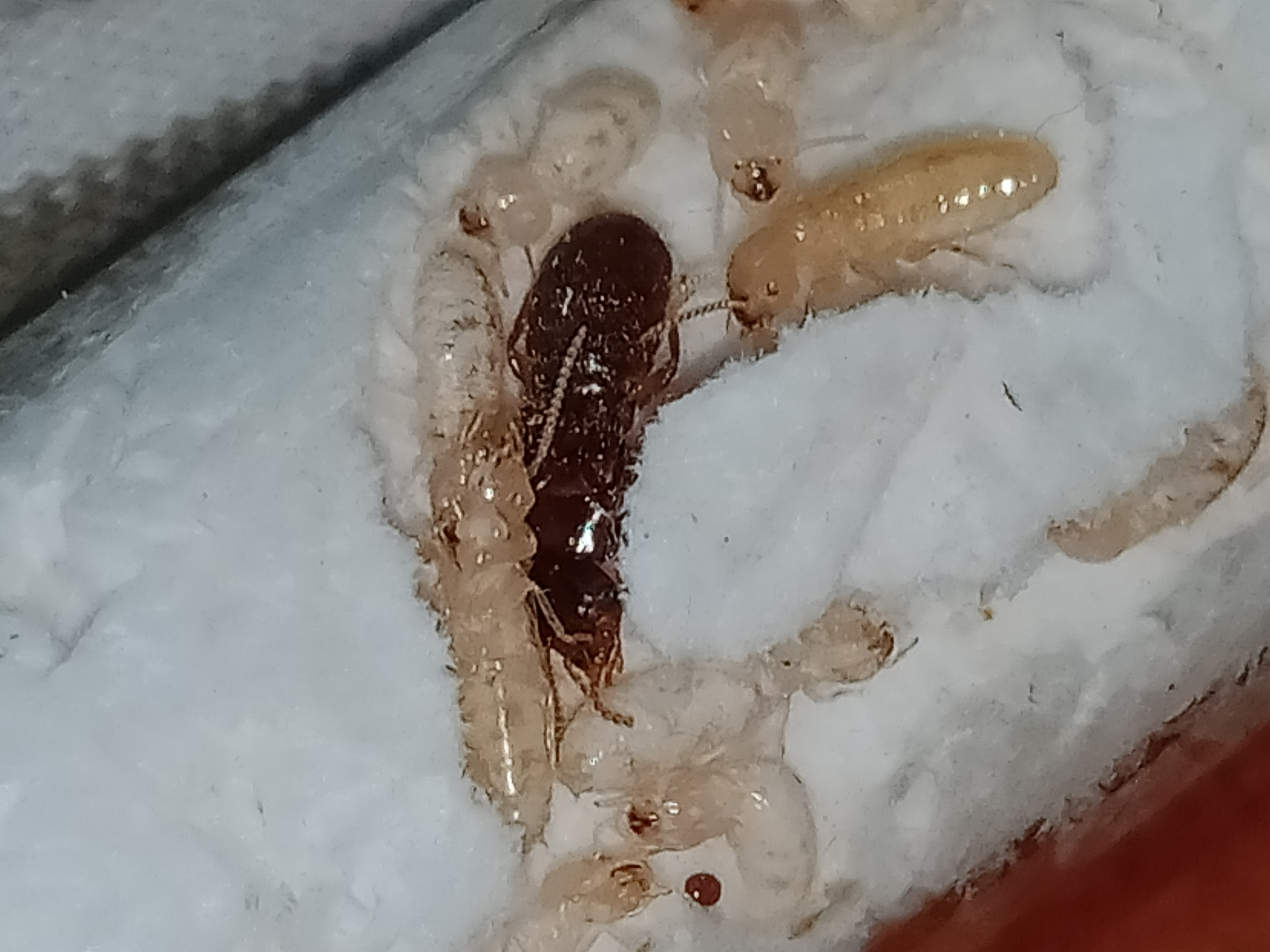
Orange neotenic reproductive at top right

== Life history ==
Like other species of termites, an Asian subterranean termite colony contains three primary castes: the workers, soldiers, and reproductives. The workers are responsible for feeding the colony and caring for the young, and the soldiers are responsible for its defence. The king mates with the queen, whose chief function over a life of many years is the continuous laying of eggs. Her abdomen increases in size enormously in comparison to that of the king. The workers feed her, as she is unable to feed herself. In a mature colony, some eggs develop into winged reproductives, known as alates. They emerge above ground and form a swarm containing many thousands of individuals. This usually happens in the evening or at night in the spring. When a swarm is found inside a building, this may be the first sign to the owners of the presence of termites in the structure. On returning to the ground, the alates shed their wings. They are unlikely to find a suitable place to start a colony inside a building, but in the open, each female looks for an appropriate site with damp soil and moist timber. In a suitable crevice, a female and a male form a nursery chamber and 15 to 30 eggs are laid. These are reared by the king and queen and a second batch of eggs is laid a few weeks later. Workers from the first batch care for these. It may take several years for the colony to build up to sufficient numbers for winged reproductives to be formed.

In a research study in Thailand, the foraging population of an average colony was 1.13 to 2.75 million individuals.

== Damage ==
These termites are voracious feeders and consume wood, cardboard, and paper and sometimes even fabric. They feed on all sorts of cellulose-containing materials and drill holes in such materials as rubber, plastic, and styrofoam in their search for food. They also attack living trees by consuming the heartwood which weakens the trees and can bring them down in a storm. They live underground and enter buildings through cracks, expansion joints, and utility conduits. They sometimes form foraging tubes along the surface of the ground and the outside surfaces of structures. They eat structural timbers from the inside outwards, leaving a thin film of surface wood which may display a blistered appearance. In Singapore and Malaysia, this species is responsible for 80% to 90% of the damage caused to manmade structures by insects and it is the commonest species of termite found in built-up areas.
