= Coptotermes frenchi =

Scientific classification
- Kingdom: Animalia
- Phylum: Arthropoda
- Clade: Pancrustacea
- Class: Insecta
- Order: Blattodea
- Infraorder: Isoptera
- Family: Heterotermitidae
- Genus: Coptotermes
- Species: C. frenchi

Binomial name
- Coptotermes frenchi Hill

Species of termite

Coptotermes frenchi, the Australian subterranean termite, is a species of termite in the family Heterotermitidae. Termites are social insects and C. frenchi usually builds its communal nest in the root crown of a tree. From this, a network of galleries extends through the nearby soil, enabling the workers to forage in the surrounding area without emerging on the surface of the ground.

== The colony ==
Termites are social insects with a caste system and individuals are either reproductives, workers, or soldiers. The reproductives have eyes, a brown chitinised exterior, and may have wings. Two of these reproductives are the queen and king, and these remain in the nest and produce and fertilise eggs. The workers and soldiers are blind, have soft unpigmented bodies and no wings, and normally remain under cover in dark, moist environments. The workers build the nest, create underground passages and mud-roofed runways, and go out to forage. They care for the young and feed the reproductives and the soldiers. The soldiers guard the colony, attacking intruders with their powerful jaws. The nest of C. frenchi is normally in the root crown of a living tree and is composed of mud and masticated wood pulp. It has a fragile outer layer and a softer interior mass of passages and chambers.

== The termites ==
Several species of termites are found in Australia and they are difficult to distinguish from one another. C. frenchi is most likely to be confused with C. acinaciformis or C. lacteus. Viewed from above, the soldiers of C. frenchi and C. lacteus have pear-shaped heads while the heads of C. acinaciformis soldiers are more rectangular. C. frenchi soldiers at 4 to 5 mm (0.16 to 0.20 in) long are intermediate in size between the other two species. These soldiers have large, sabre-shaped mandibles and a glandular pore on the forehead which secretes a milky, latex fluid.

== Distribution and habitat ==
C. frenchi is native to Australia and is present in the coastal area of Queensland and in New South Wales, Australian Capital Territory, Victoria, South Australia, and Western Australia. The nests are typically in the root crown of eucalyptus trees, or inside the trunks within a few metres of the ground, but in the drier parts of the country, the nest sometimes takes the form of a mound on the ground. Observing nests is often difficult because the activities of the termites are conducted out of sight. They have galleries that spread outwards from the nest in a network of underground passages and covered surface runways that may extend for 50 m (164 ft) from the tree. C. frenchi is more timid and less aggressive than C. acinaciformis. It is most often found in forests where it attacks living trees, but it also damages the structural timbers of buildings, poles, and fence posts, hollowing away the interior and leaving a thin layer of apparently sound timber behind.

== Ecology ==
Various insects and other invertebrates live inside termite nests, often tolerated by their hosts because they produce exudates or provide useful services, but some are predators and feed on termite eggs and larvae. Ants are the most important foes and can gain entry if the exterior coverings of runways or nests are damaged. Sometimes, parasitic mites are found on the soft bodies of the termites, and in some instances, these flourish to such an extent that the colony is killed. Termites are also attractive to mammals such as the numbat and echidna, which break their way into the colony, and when the winged reproductives leave the nest, they are consumed by birds, lizards, and spiders.
