= Ahamitermes =

Scientific classification
- Domain: Eukaryota
- Kingdom: Animalia
- Phylum: Arthropoda
- Class: Insecta
- Order: Blattodea
- Infraorder: Isoptera
- Family: Termitidae
- Subfamily: Termitinae
- Genus: Ahamitermes; Mjöberg, 1920

Species
- See text

Genus of termites

Ahamitermes is a genus of termites in the family Termitidae containing four species, all of which have a parasitic relationship with termites in the genus Coptotermes. The host and the parasite dwell in separate parts of the mound nest and are mutually antagonistic. The Ahamitermes live in the innermost parts of the nest and feed on the "carton" material with which the galleries are lined which consists of soil particles, chewed wood and cellulose, bound together with saliva and faeces. They are thus dependent on their host for both their food and their home and are not found in any other situations. The genus was first described in 1920 by Eric Mjöberg.

== Species ==
- Ahamitermes nidicola Mjoberg - Queensland
- Ahamitermes hillii Nicholls - Southwestern Australia
- Ahamitermes inclusus Gay - Western Australia
- Ahamitermes pumilus Hill - New South Wales and Western Australia
