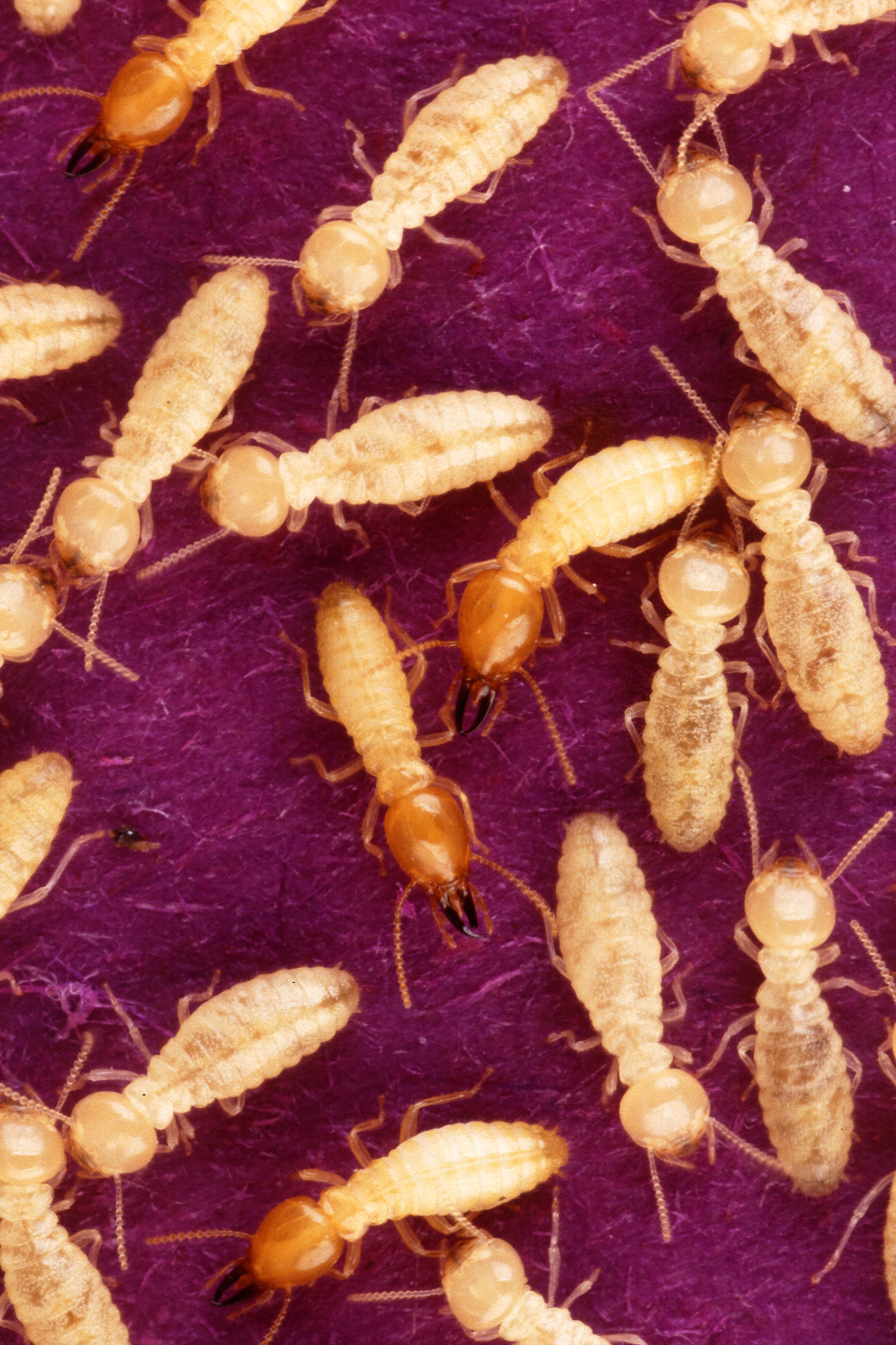

Scientific classification
- Kingdom: Animalia
- Phylum: Arthropoda
- Clade: Pancrustacea
- Class: Insecta
- Order: Blattodea
- Infraorder: Isoptera
- Family: Heterotermitidae
- Genus: Coptotermes
- Species: C. formosanus

Binomial name
- Coptotermes formosanus Shiraki, 1909

Synonyms
- Coptotermes formosae Holmgren, 1911; Coptotermes hongkonensis Oshima, 1914; Coptotermes intrudens Oshima, 1920; Coptotermes remotus Silvestri, 1927; Coptotermes eucalyptus Ping, 1984; Coptotermes xiaoliangensis Ping, 1984; Coptotermes guangzhouensis Ping, 1985; Coptotermes heteromorphus Ping, 1985; Coptotermes (Polycrinitermes) communis Xia & He, 1986; Coptotermes (Polycrinitermes) guizhouensis He & Qui, 1992; Coptotermes rectangularis Ping & Xu, 1986

= Formosan subterranean termite =

Formosan termite

Species of termite

The Formosan termite (Coptotermes formosanus) is a species of termite local to southern China and introduced to Taiwan (formerly known as Formosa, where it gets its name), Japan, South Africa, Sri Lanka, Hawaii, and the continental United States.

The Formosan termite is often nicknamed the super-termite because of its destructive habits due to the large size of its colonies and its ability to consume wood at a rapid rate. Populations of these termites have become large enough to appear on New Orleans' weather radars.

A mature Formosan colony can consume as much as 13 ounces of wood a day (about 400 g) and can severely damage a structure in as little as three months.

Formosan termites infest a wide variety of structures (including boats and high-rise condominiums) and can damage trees. In the United States, along with another species, Coptotermes gestroi, introduced from Southeast Asia, they are responsible for tremendous damage to property resulting in large treatment and repair costs.

== Biology ==
Coptotermes formosanus is a social insect.

=== Nutrition ===
Crops include sugarcane.

=== Reproduction and lifecycle stages ===
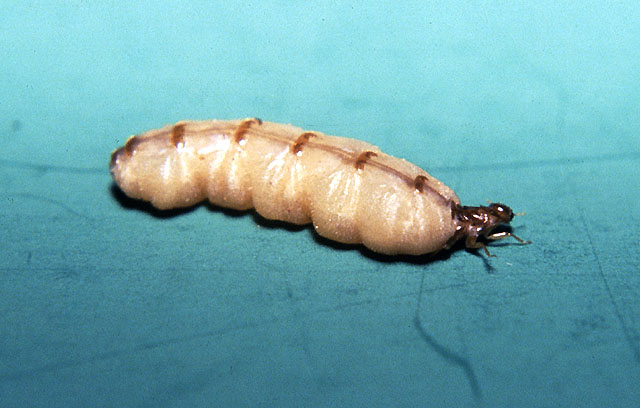
Fertile queen

== As an introduced species ==
=== History ===
Formosan termites are rarely found north of 35°N. They have been reported in 11 states, including Alabama, California, Florida, Georgia, Hawaii, Louisiana, Mississippi, North Carolina, South Carolina, Tennessee, and Texas. Their distribution is restricted to southern areas of the United States because their eggs don't hatch below about 20 °C (68 °F).

=== Spread of Formosan infestation ===
Formosan termites, since their probable landing at the Port of New Orleans around the middle of the 20th century, have become a most serious concern to pest control regulators and researchers. In the 1970's, the United States Department of Agriculture began to track the spread of Formosan infestations. Maps of counties infested by Formosans were published by the USDA in 1975, 1990, and 2001. Universities across Texas, Louisiana, Mississippi, and Florida have published updates since then.

The annual expansion rate of Formosan infestation between 1990 and present varies from 5.3% in Mississippi to 8.1% in Texas.

Chouvenc & Helmick 2015 find that C. formosanus readily hybridizes with another invasive termite in Florida, C. gestroi.

=== Economic impact ===
Historic structures in Hawaii have been threatened, such as Iolani Palace in Honolulu.

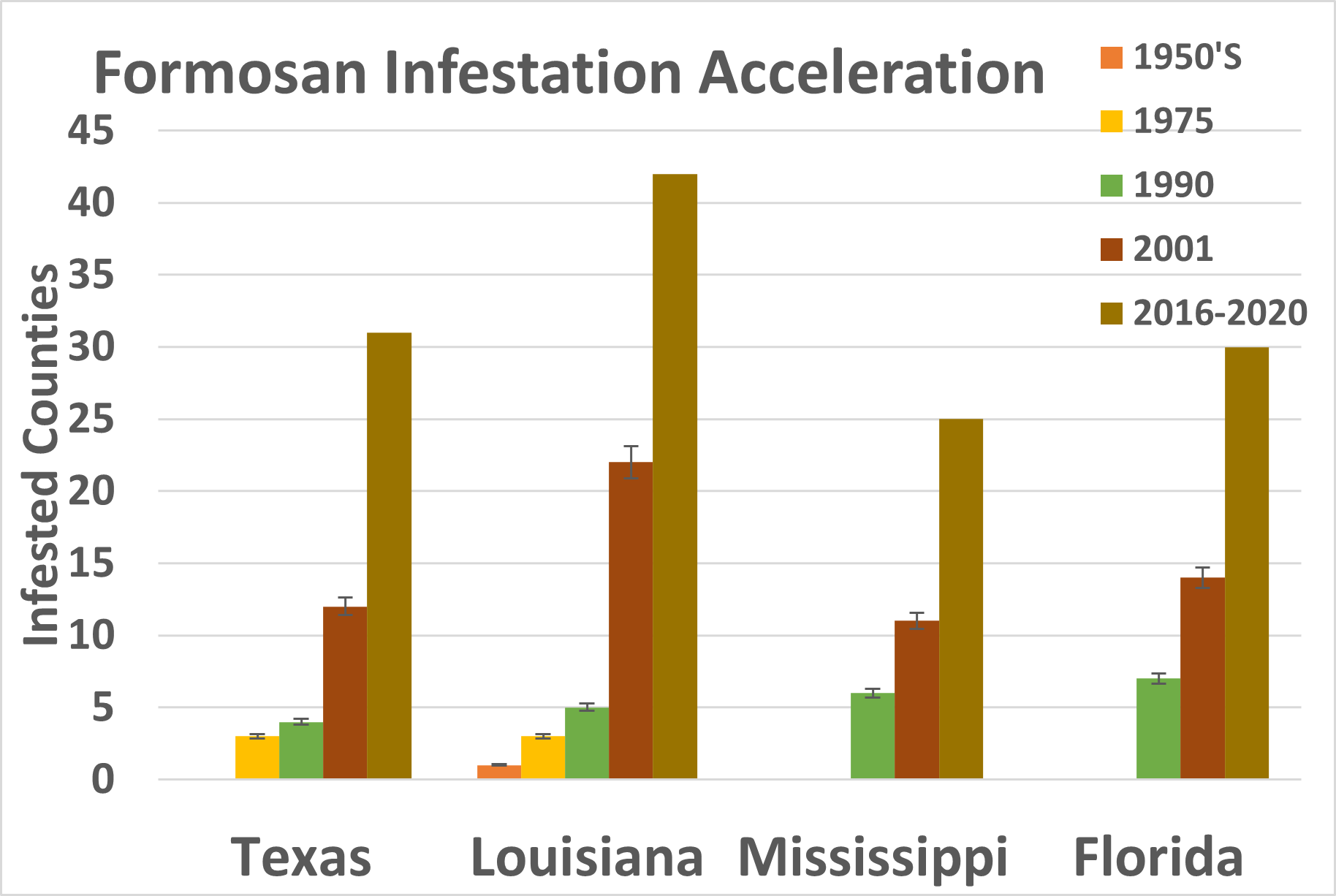

It has its greatest impact in North America. C. formosanus is the most destructive, difficult to control, and economically important species of termite in the southern United States.

The Florida Department of Agriculture and Consumer Services discusses the average cost of Formosan termite damage as "in the $10,000 range per home.......can be much higher...in some severe cases the home may have to be demolished and rebuilt." Florida Consumer Protection.

=== Formosan termite barriers ===
Physical barriers to Formosan termites have been developed. Most of these barriers must be installed during construction, but a few can be installed after construction. The most important application of these post construction barriers is the stone particle barrier, used to protect exposed concrete perimeters.

The International Code Council (ICC) has issued an acceptance standard called AC 380 Acceptance Criteria for Termite Physical Barrier Systems which requires five years of controlled field trials in multiple Formosan termite infested locations. These acceptance criteria are rigorous and are drawn from the criteria used by state and federal pest control regulators for termite control methods.

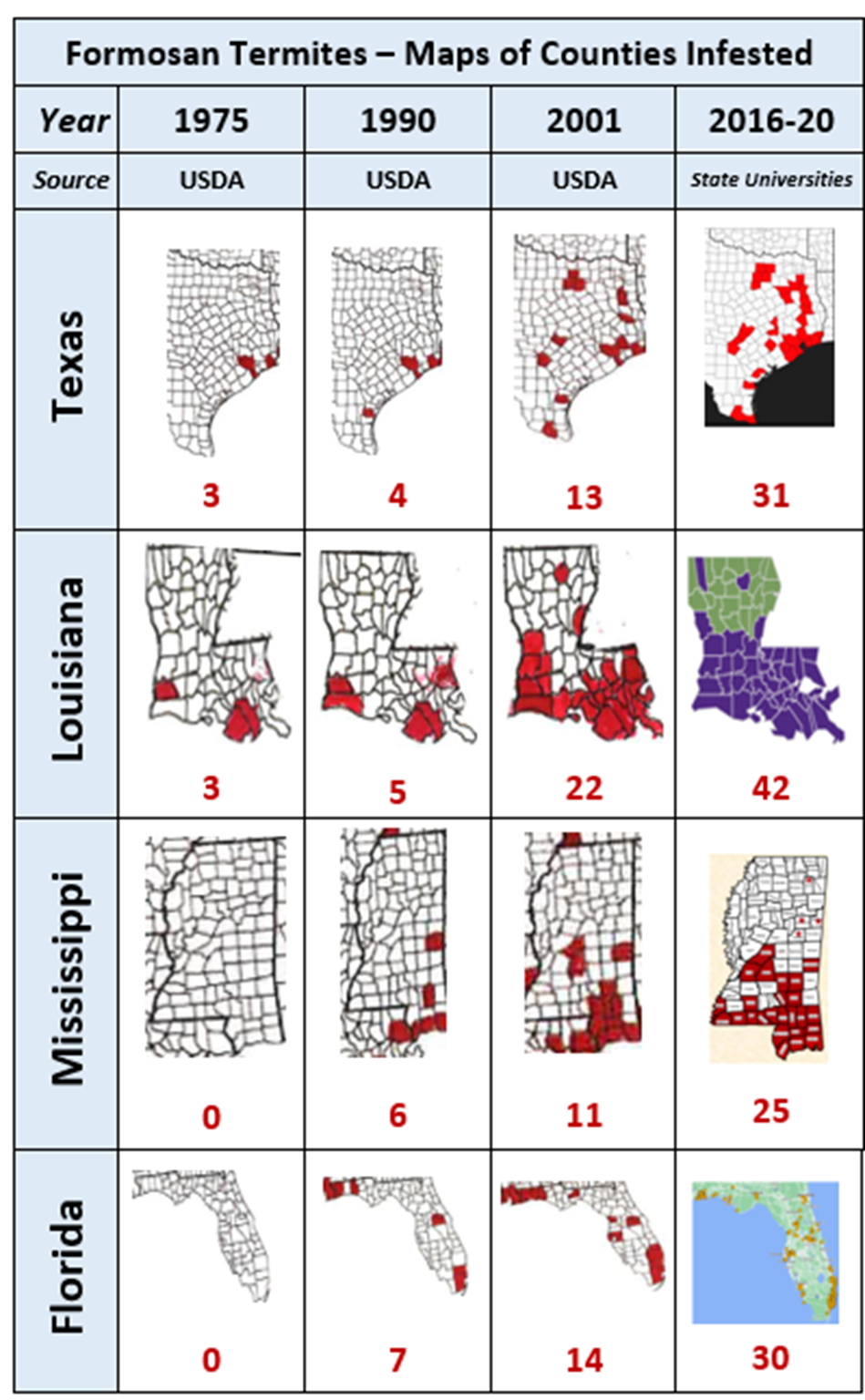
