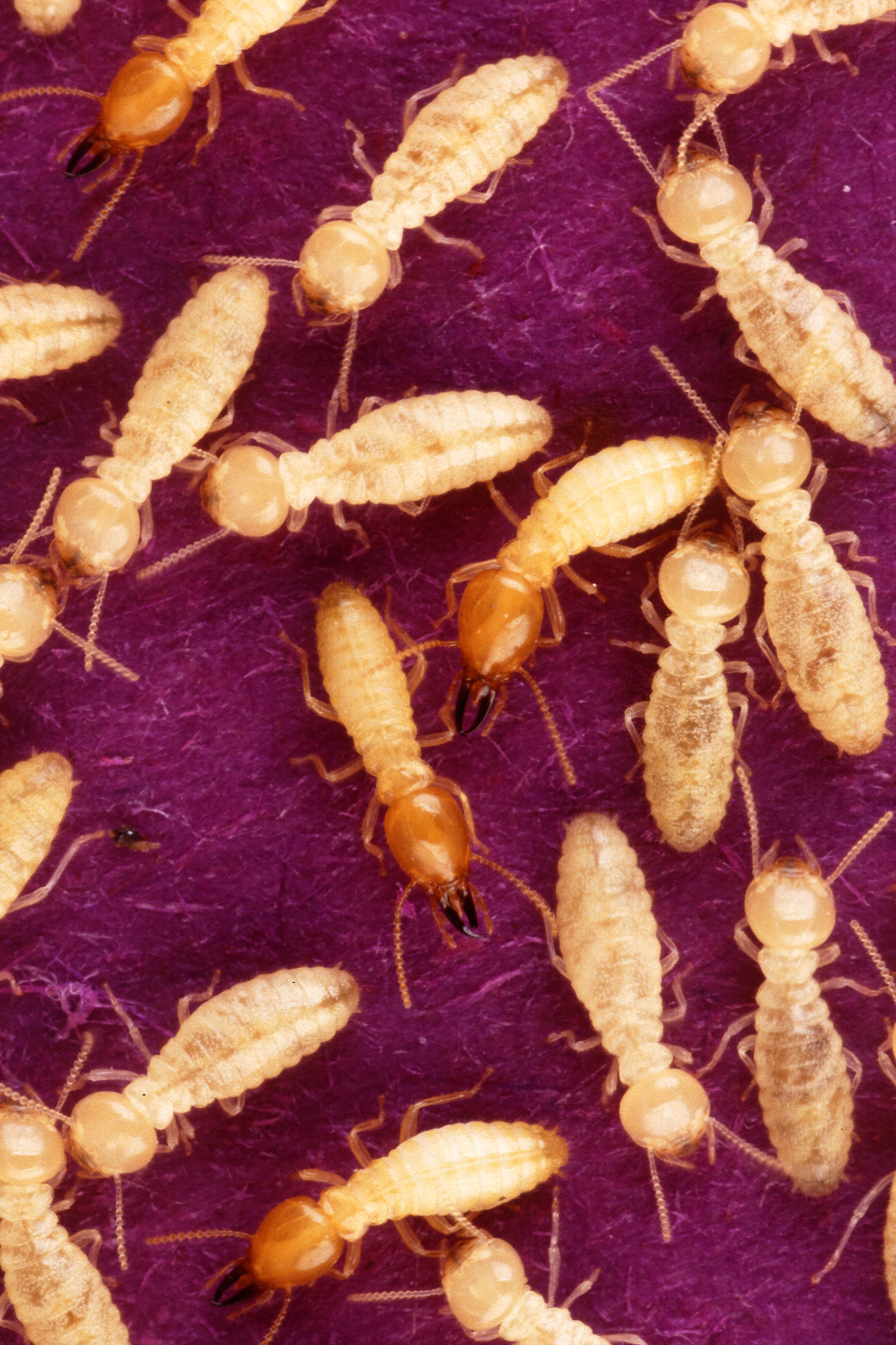
- Formosan subterranean termites

Scientific classification
- Kingdom: Animalia
- Phylum: Arthropoda
- Clade: Pancrustacea
- Class: Insecta
- Order: Blattodea
- Infraorder: Isoptera
- Family: Heterotermitidae
- Genus: Coptotermes; Wasmann 1896

Species
- See text

Synonyms
- Arrhinotermes Wasmann 1902; Vastitermes Sjöstedt 1926

= Coptotermes =

Genus of termites

Coptotermes is a genus of termites in the family Heterotermitidae. Many of the roughly 71 species are economically destructive pests. The genus is thought to have originated in Southeast Asia. Worker termites from this genus forage underground and move about in roofed tunnels that they build along the surface.

In Australia, Coptotermes colonies sometimes host a parasitic genus of termites, Ahamitermes. The host and the parasite dwell in separate parts of the mound nest and are mutually antagonistic. The Ahamitermes species live in the innermost parts of the nest and feed on the "carton" material with which the galleries are lined, which consists of soil particles, chewed wood, and cellulose, bound together with saliva and faeces. They are thus dependent on their hosts for both their food and their home and are not found in any other situations.

== Species ==
This is an incomplete list of species:

- Coptotermes acinaciformis
- Coptotermes brunneus
- Coptotermes ceylonicus
- Coptotermes curvignathus Holmgren
- Coptotermes elisae
- Coptotermes emersoni
- Coptotermes formosanus - Formosan subterranean termite
- Coptotermes frenchi
- Coptotermes gaurii
- Coptotermes gestroi - Asian subterranean termite
- Coptotermes havilandi
- Coptotermes heimi
- Coptotermes kalshoveni
- Coptotermes lacteus
- Coptotermes parvulus Holmgren
