= Coptotermes emersoni =

Scientific classification
- Domain: Eukaryota
- Kingdom: Animalia
- Phylum: Arthropoda
- Class: Insecta
- Order: Blattodea
- Infraorder: Isoptera
- Family: Rhinotermitidae
- Genus: Coptotermes
- Species: C. emersoni

Binomial name
- Coptotermes emersoni Ahmad, 1953

Species of termite

Coptotermes emersoni, is a species of subterranean termite of the genus Coptotermes. It is native to India, Sri Lanka, and Vietnam. Though it is a wood destroying termite, it was first found from an electrical wire case in the National Museum of Colombo.
