= Cribraria elegans =

Scientific classification
- Domain: Eukaryota
- Clade: Amorphea
- Phylum: Amoebozoa
- Class: Myxogastria
- Order: Liceida
- Family: Cribrariaceae
- Genus: Cribraria
- Species: C. elegans

Binomial name
- Cribraria elegans Berk. & M.A.Curtis 1873

Species of slime mould

Cribraria elegans is a species of slime molds. It is found in the United States, Europe (including France) and Japan.
