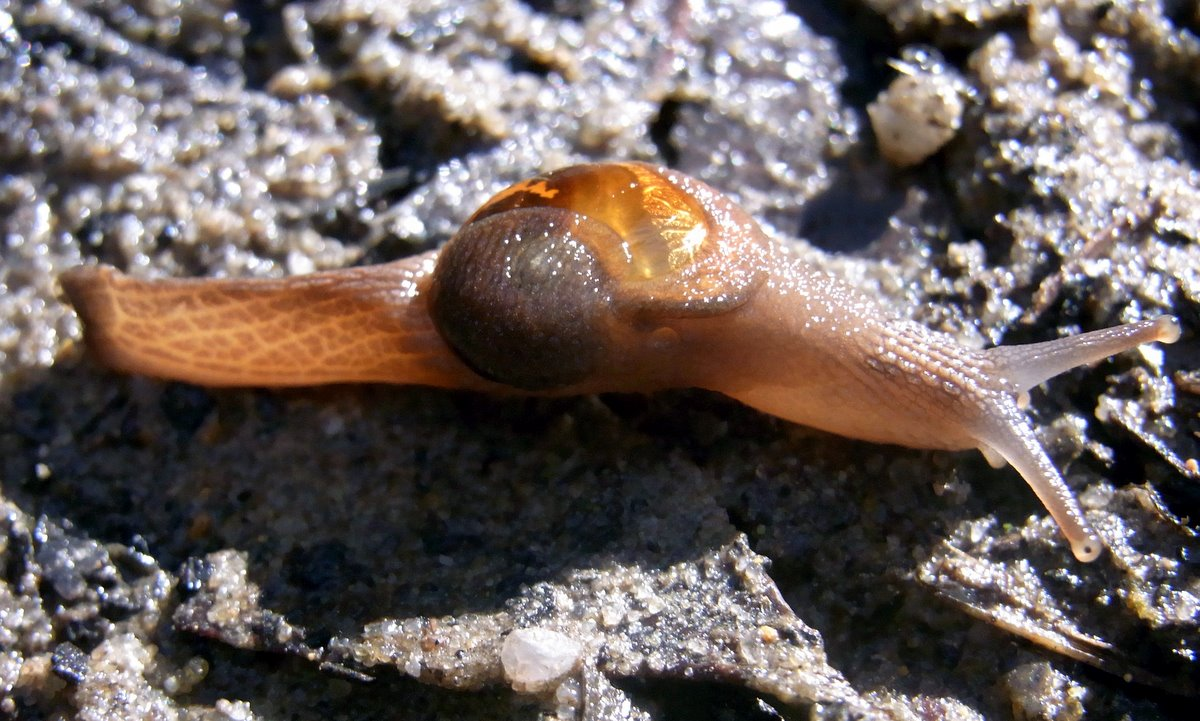
- Helicarion mastersi

Scientific classification
- Kingdom: Animalia
- Phylum: Mollusca
- Class: Gastropoda
- Order: Stylommatophora
- Family: Helicarionidae
- Genus: Helicarion; Férussac, 1821

Synonyms
- Helecarion Férussac, 1821 (misspelling of original genus name, Helicarion Férussac, 1821); Helicarion (Helicarion) Férussac, 1821; Helixarion Férussac, 1821 (incorrect original spelling)

= Helicarion =

Genus of land snails and semislugs

Helicarion is a genus of air-breathing land snails or semislugs, terrestrial pulmonate gastropod molluscs in the family Helicarionidae.

Helicarion is the type genus of the family Helicarionidae.

== Species ==
Species within the genus Helicarion include:

- Helicarion altitudinis Pilsbry, 1934
- Helicarion australis Reeve, 1862
- Helicarion castanea (Pfeiffer, 1853)
- Helicarion cuvieri Férussac, 1821 - type species
- Helicarion mastersi Cox, 1868
- Helicarion melanesicus I. Rensch, 1932
- Helicarion perfragilis Möllendorff, 1897 (taxon inquirendum)
- Helicarion schneideri I. Rensch, 1932
- Helicarion willeyana Godwin-Austen, 1903

Species brought into synonymy

- Helicarion leopardina Iredale, 1941: synonym of Helicarion cuvieri Férussac, 1821
- Helicarion porrectusIredale, 1941: synonym of Mysticarion porrectus Iredale, 1941
- Helicarion rubicundus (Dartnall & Kershaw, 1978) was moved to the monotypic genus Attenborougharion in 2017
