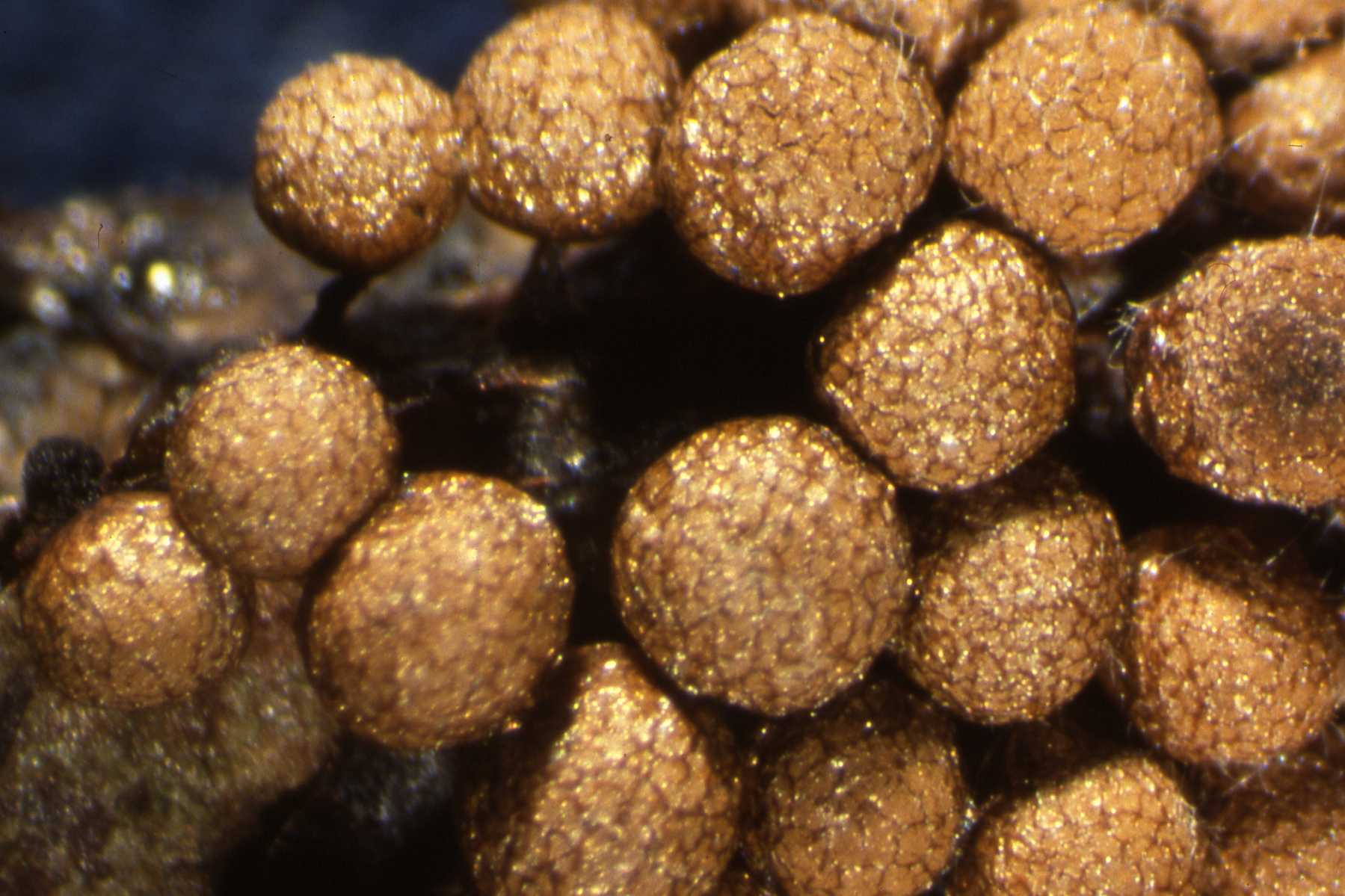
- Cribraria argillacea

Scientific classification
- Domain: Eukaryota
- Phylum: Amoebozoa
- Class: Myxogastria
- Order: Cribrariales
- Family: Cribrariaceae
- Genus: Cribraria; Pers. (1794)

Type species
- Cribraria rufescens Pers. (1794)

Synonyms
- Dictydium Schrad. (1797); Heterodictyon Rostaf. (1873)

= Cribraria =

Genus of slime moulds

Cribraria is a genus of slime molds from the group of Myxogastria. It comprises about 30 species, some of which are extremely difficult to distinguish.

== Features ==
The fruiting bodies are usually pedunculated sporangia, a calyculus may be present or absent. The delicate peridium is reduced to a structure of vertical, thickened threads that are interconnected by extremely fine, translucent transverse threads. In some cases, however, the peridium may also appear like a net, as in Cribraria - species. Mostly dark, clearly visible dictydine granules are found especially close to the ribs of the peridia, the calyculus and the spores.

== Distribution ==
The genus is distributed worldwide, about two-thirds of the species are, however, [neotropic] ch. Many of their species are common in the respective distribution areas.

== Systematics and research history ==
The genus was first described in 1794 by Christiaan Hendrik Persoon, type species is Cribraria rufescens .

The genus includes at least 30 species, including:

== Species ==
- Cribraria angulospora
- Cribraria argillacea
- Cribraria atrofusca
- Cribraria aurantiaca
- Cribraria cancellata
- Cribraria confusa
- Cribraria costata
- Cribraria cribrarioides
- Cribraria dictyospora
- Cribraria elegans
- Cribraria enodis
- Cribraria exigua
- Cribraria ferruginea
- Cribraria filiformis
- Cribraria fragilis
- Cribraria intricata
- Cribraria irregularis
- Cribraria languescens
- Cribraria laxa
- Cribraria lepida
- Cribraria macrocarpa
- Cribraria macrospora
- Cribraria macrostipitata
- Cribraria martinii
- Cribraria media
- Cribraria meylanii
- Cribraria microcarpa
- Cribraria minutissima
- Cribraria mirabilis
- Cribraria oregana
- Cribraria paucicostata
- Cribraria paucidictyon
- Cribraria persoonii
- Cribraria pertenuis
- Cribraria piriformis
- Cribraria purpurea
- Cribraria rubiginosa
- Cribraria rufa
- Cribraria rutila
- Cribraria splendens
- Cribraria stellifera
- Cribraria tecta
- Cribraria tenella
- Cribraria violacea
- Cribraria vulgaris
- Cribraria zonatispora
