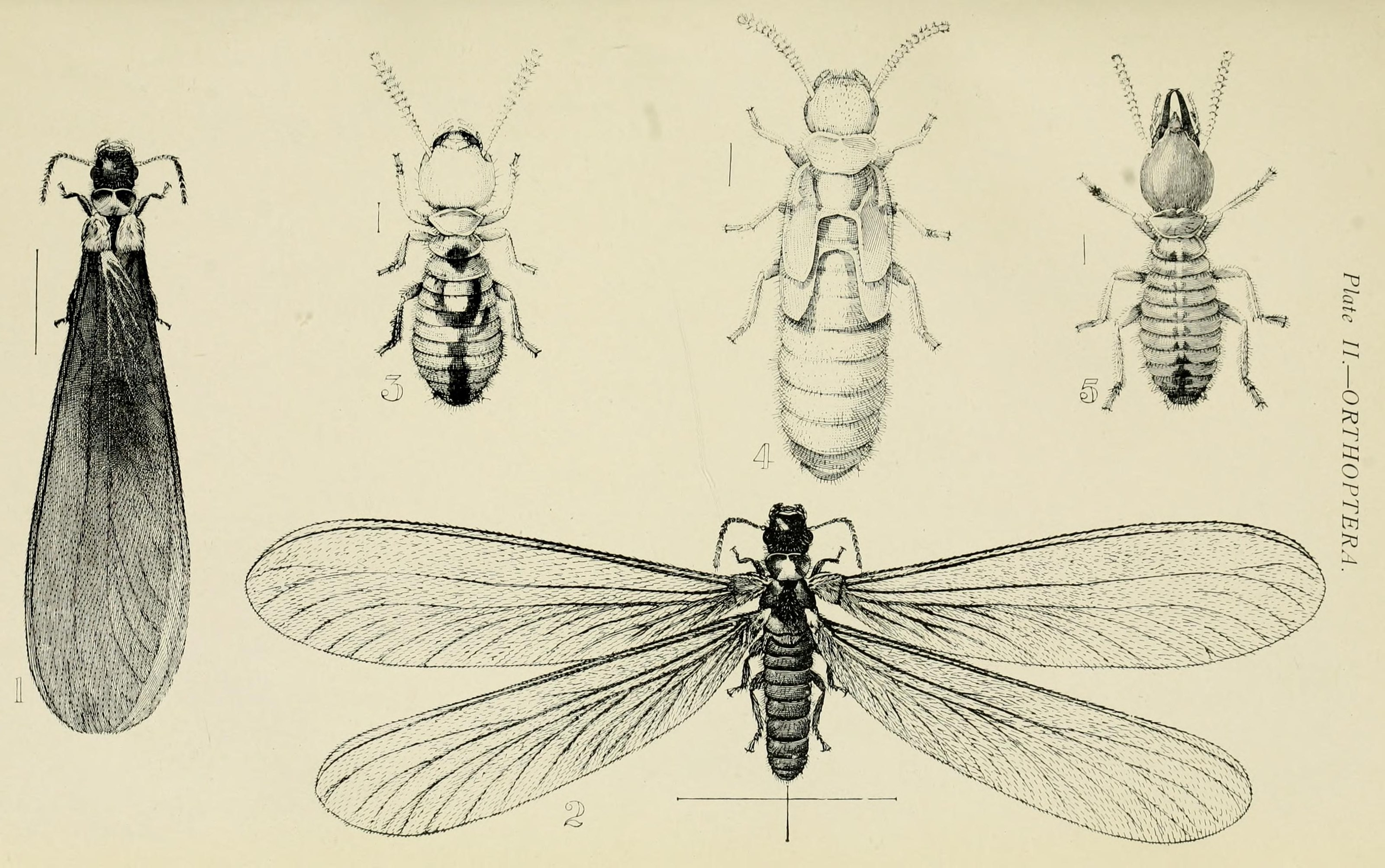

Scientific classification
- Kingdom: Animalia
- Phylum: Arthropoda
- Clade: Pancrustacea
- Class: Insecta
- Order: Blattodea
- Infraorder: Isoptera
- Family: Heterotermitidae
- Genus: Coptotermes
- Species: C. lacteus

Binomial name
- Coptotermes lacteus (Froggatt)

= Coptotermes lacteus =

Species of termite

Coptotermes lacteus, the milk termite, is a species of termite in the family Heterotermitidae, native to Australia. These termites are social insects and build a communal nest in the form of a mound. From this, a network of galleries extends through the nearby soil, enabling the workers to forage in the surrounding area without emerging on the surface of the ground.

== Description ==
Several species of termites are found in Australia and they are difficult to distinguish from one another. C. lacteus is most likely to be confused with C. acinaciformis or C. frenchi. The soldiers of C. frenchi and C. lacteus have pear-shaped heads, while the heads of C. acinaciformis soldiers are more rectangular. C. lacteus soldiers at 4 to 4.8 mm (0.16 to 0.19 in) long are slightly smaller in size than the other two species.

== Distribution and habitat ==
The mound nests of C. lacteus are smaller than those of the magnetic termite Amitermes meridionalis. The outer layer is thick and hard and inside this is a hard mass of cemented soil particles and a central soft, papery nursery area where the queen and developing nymphs live.
