= Ficus fergusonii =

Scientific classification
- Kingdom: Plantae
- Clade: Tracheophytes
- Clade: Angiosperms
- Clade: Eudicots
- Clade: Rosids
- Order: Rosales
- Family: Moraceae
- Genus: Ficus
- Species: F. fergusonii

Binomial name
- Ficus fergusonii (King) T.B.Worth. ex Corner

Synonyms
- Ficus altissima var. fergusonii King

Species of flowering plant

Ficus fergusonii, is a species of flowering plant in the family Moraceae. It is endemic to Sri Lanka.
