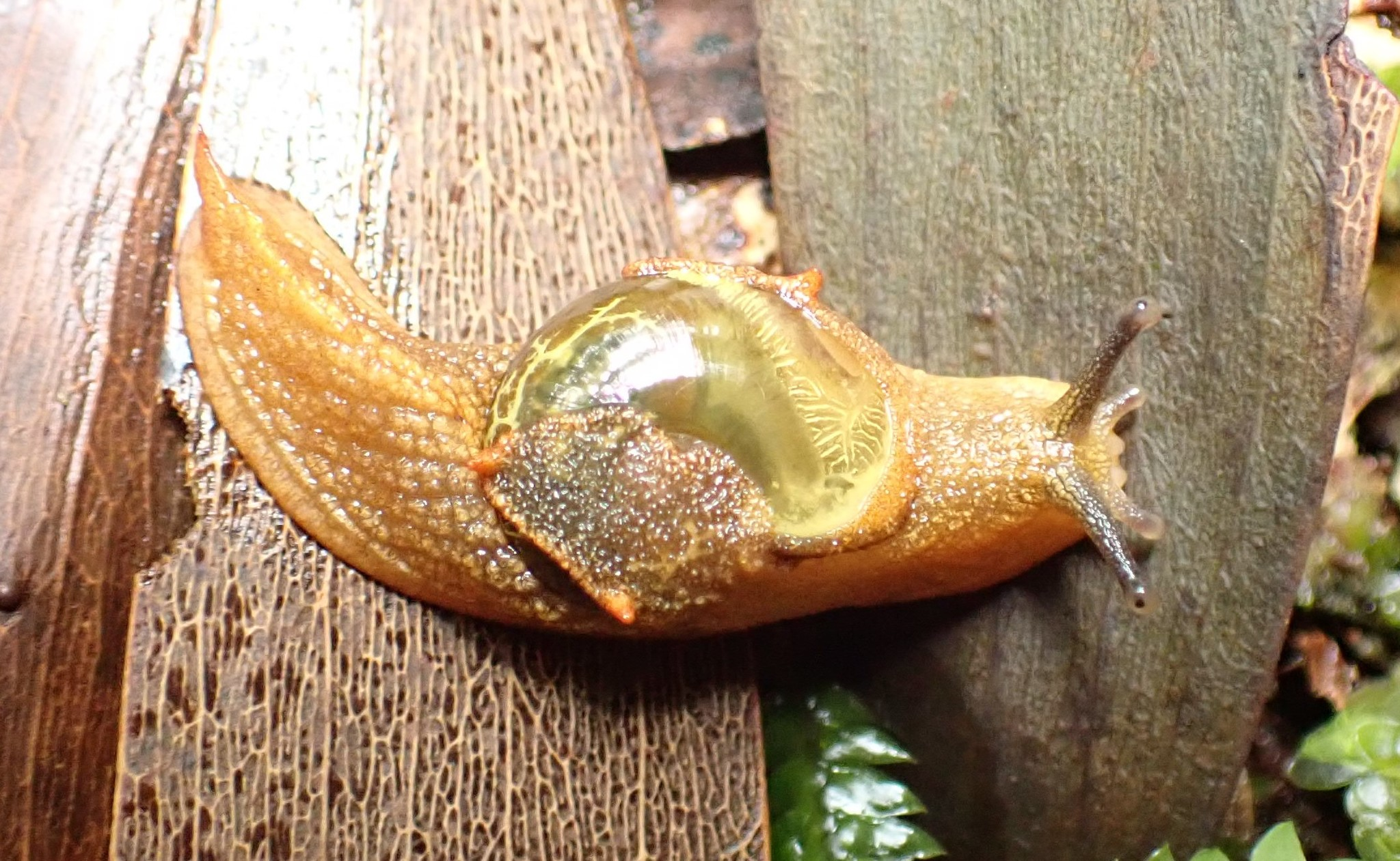

Scientific classification
- Kingdom: Animalia
- Phylum: Mollusca
- Class: Gastropoda
- Order: Stylommatophora
- Family: Helicarionidae
- Genus: Helicarion
- Species: H. cuvieri

Binomial name
- Helicarion cuvieri Férussac, 1821

Synonyms
- Helicarion leopardina Iredale, 1941; Helicarion mastersi callidus Iredale, 1941 (junior synonym); Helicarion nigra (Quoy & Gaimard, 1832) (junior synonym); Helix buttoni Petterd, 1879 (junior synonym); Helix vitrinaformis Legrand, 1871 (junior synonym); Vitrina nigra Quoy & Gaimard, 1832 (junior synonym); Vitrina verrauxii Pfeiffer, 1850 (junior synonym)

= Helicarion cuvieri =

Species of semislug from Australia

Helicarion cuvieri is a species of air-breathing land snail or semi-slug, a terrestrial pulmonate gastropod mollusc in the family Helicarionidae.

== Distribution ==
This species is endemic to south-eastern Australia.
