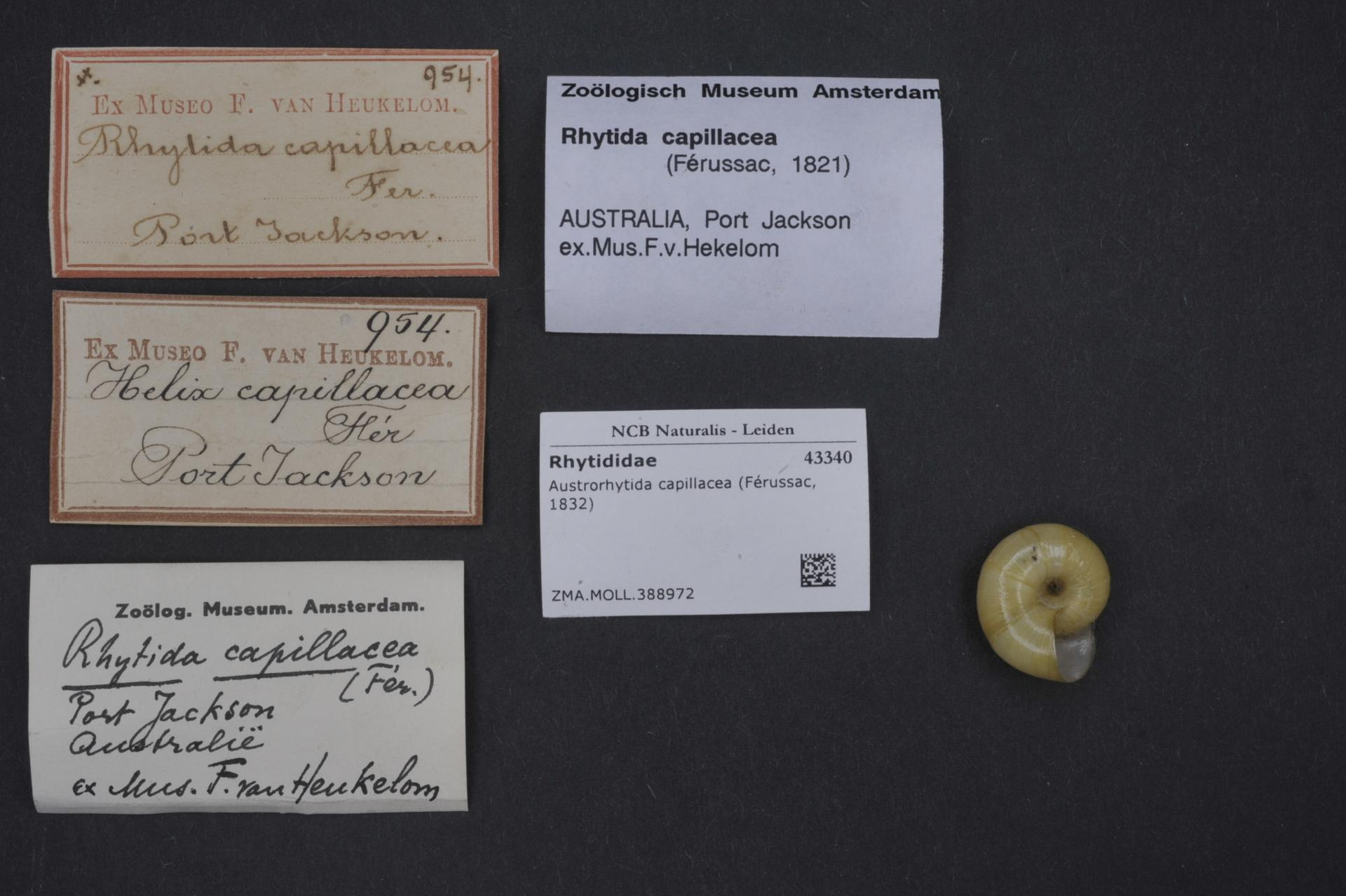

Scientific classification
- Kingdom: Animalia
- Phylum: Mollusca
- Class: Gastropoda
- Order: Stylommatophora
- Family: Rhytididae
- Genus: Austrorhytida
- Species: A. capillacea

Binomial name
- Austrorhytida capillacea Férussac, 1832

Synonyms
- Helix capillacea Férussac, 1832 (original combination); Helix strangei Pfeiffer, 1849 (junior synonym); Nanina fricta Gould, 1852 (junior synonym); Rhytida (Strangesta) capillacea (Férussac, 1832) (unaccepted combination); Strangesta revera Iredale, 1943 · unaccepted (junior synonym); Strangesta sanguinolenta McLauchlan, 1954 · unaccepted (junior synonym); Zonites strangei L. Pfeiffer, 1849 · unaccepted (junior synonym)

= Austrorhytida capillacea =

Species of snail from Australia

Austrorhytida capillacea is a species of air-breathing land snail found in Australia.
