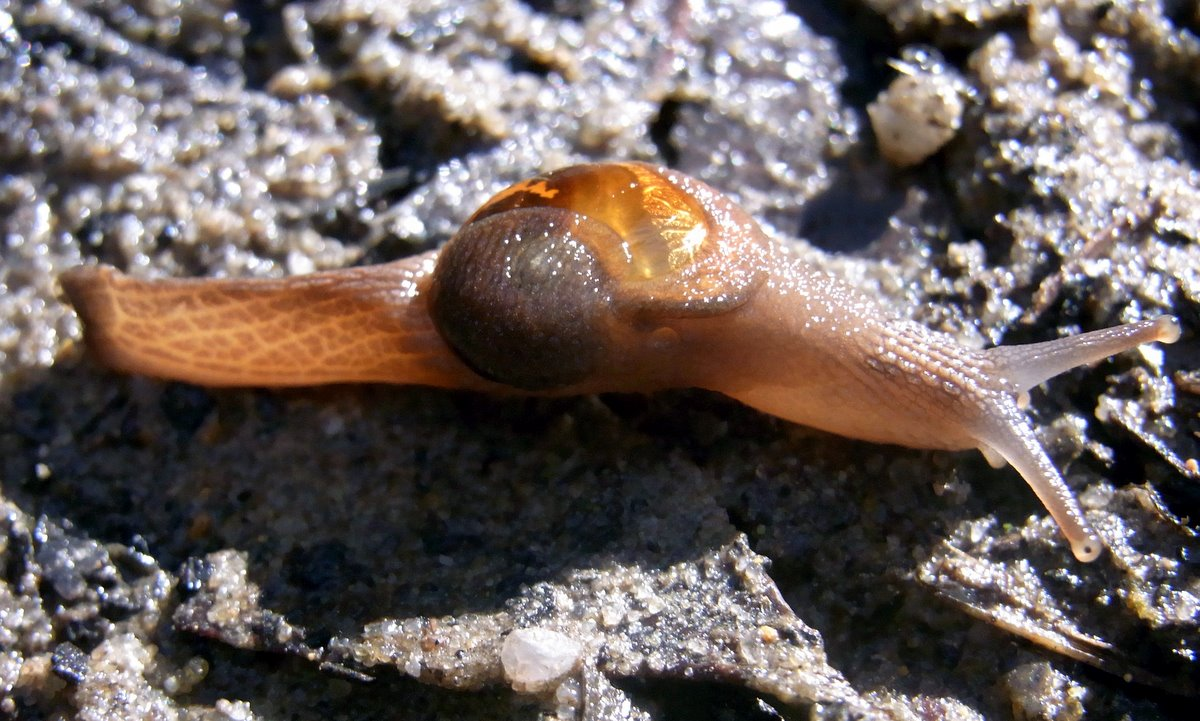
- Helicarion mastersi, about 1 inch (2.5 cm) long, crawling on a wet track at Pigeon House Mountain, Australia

Scientific classification
- Kingdom: Animalia
- Phylum: Mollusca
- Class: Gastropoda
- Order: Stylommatophora
- Family: Helicarionidae
- Genus: Helicarion
- Species: H. mastersi

Binomial name
- Helicarion mastersi (J. C. Cox, 1868)
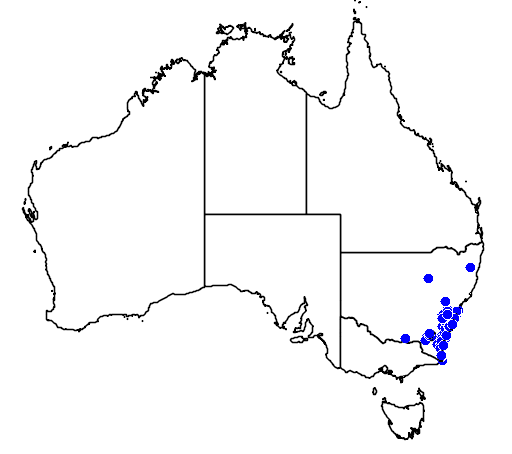
- Distribution map of Helicarion mastersi

Synonyms
- Vitrina mastersi J. C. Cox, 1868

= Helicarion mastersi =

Species of semislug from Australia

Helicarion mastersi is a species of air-breathing land snail, also referred to as a semi-slug because of its small shell. It is a terrestrial pulmonate gastropod mollusc in the family Helicarionidae.

The specific name mastersi is in honor of the Australian malacologist George Masters (1837–1912), who collected the type specimen.

== Subspecies ==
Subspecies include:

- Helicarion mastersi callidus Iredale, 1941
- Helicarion mastersi mastersi (Cox, 1868)

== Distribution ==
This species is found in New South Wales, Australia.

The type locality is Kiama, New South Wales, Australia.

== Description ==
Helicarion mastersi was originally described (under the name Vitrina mastersi) by James Charles Cox in 1868. Cox's original text (the type description) reads as follows:

Shell depressed, very thin, smooth, transparent, extremely shining, very finely curvately striated, with a few faint spiral lines, bright golden yellow with occasionally a greenish tinge; spire very slightly prominent, apex central, suture impressed, narrowly margined; whorls 3, slightly convex, last rather depressed, rounded at the periphery, and rather convex beneath on outer half; aperture (mollusc) diagonal, lunately ovate; peristome simple, right margin slightly dilated above and in front, left rather straightly continuous with the columella, which is strongly arcuate above, the left margin and base membranous and flattened.

Diameter, greatest 0.55; least 0.38; height 0.17; aperture 0.35 long; 0.27 broad, of an inch.

Habitat. Kiama, N. S. W. − Masters.

A delicate bright golden-yellow hyaline shell, allied to V. Strangei, but easily distinguished by being much more depressed, and having half of the base membranous. The animal of this shell is whitish, and not grey as in V. Strangei.

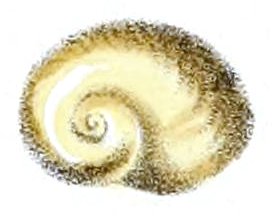
Drawing of apical view

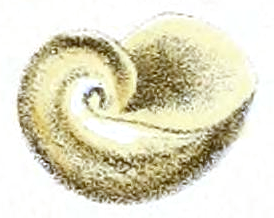
Drawing of umbilical view

== Ecology ==
This semislug lives in closed Eucalyptus forests. It is primarily an arboreal species, but it can also be found in leaf litter.
