= Root crown =

Intersection between the root and the stem

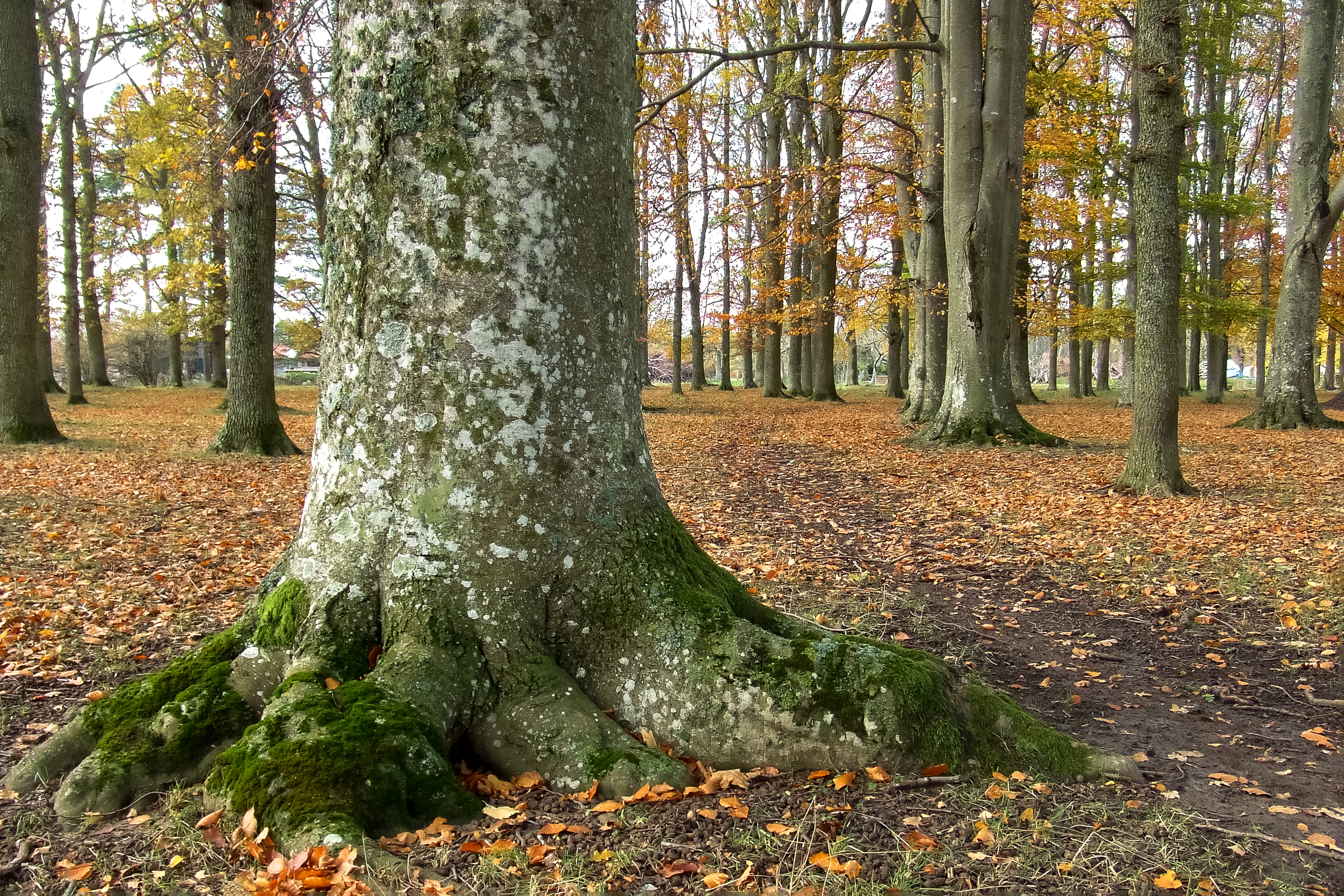
The root crown on a beech tree, Nygårds farm, Sweden (1 November, 2008)

A root crown, also known as the root collar or root neck, is the part of a plant where the stem and the root system meet. Since roots and stems have quite different vascular anatomies, major vascular changes take place at this point.

Root-crown temperature has been found to affect plant growth and physiology in a number of ways. Root crowns need to be exposed and 'breathe'; this is one way that some plants take in oxygen.

A number of pests and diseases affect specifically this part of the plant, including root-crown rot (or root-crown fungus) and a number of species of root-crown weevil.

The root crown area usually appears swollen, tapered, constricted or very thin - as well as a combination of these. The area of the root crown is usually located around or at the soil level and can be vaguely or clearly apparent.
