= List of fungi of South Africa – I =

This is an alphabetical list of fungal taxa as recorded from South Africa. Currently accepted names have been appended.

== Ic ==
Genus: Icmadophila Trevis. 1852 (lichen)

- Icmadophila ericetorum (L.) Zahlbr. 1895

== Il ==
Genus: Ileodictyon Tul. & C. Tul. 1844

- Ileodictyon cibarium Tul. & C. Tul. 1844

== Im ==
Genus: Imbricaria (Schreb.) Michx. 1803 accepted as Anaptychia Körb., (1848)

- Imbricaria hottentottum (Ach.) Schwend. 1863 accepted as Xanthoparmelia hottentotta (Ach.) A. Thell, Feuerer, Elix & Kärnefelt, (2006)

== In ==
Genus: Inocybe (Fr.) Fr. 1863

- Inocybe microspora J.E. Lange 1917 accepted as Inocybe glabripes Ricken, (1915)

== Ir ==
Genus: Irene Theiss., Syd. & P. Syd. 1917, accepted as Asteridiella McAlpine, (1897)

- Irene atra (Doidge) Doidge (1920), accepted as Asteridiella atra (Doidge) Hansf., (1961)
- Irene calostroma (Desm.) Höhn. (1918), accepted as Appendiculella calostroma (Desm.) Höhn.,(1919)
- Irene ditricha (Kalchbr. & Cooke) Doidge, (1920)
- Irene ekebergiae Doidge (1941), accepted as Asteridiella ekebergiae (Doidge) Hansf., (1961)
- Irene glabra (Berk. & M.A. Curtis) Doidge (1920), accepted as Asteridiella glabra (Berk. & M.A. Curtis) Hansf., (1961)
- Irene gloriosa (Doidge) Doidge (1920), accepted as Appendiculella natalensis (Doidge) Hansf., (1961)
- Irene heudeloti (Gaillard) Doidge (1920),accepted as Irenina heudeloti (Gaillard) F. Stevens, (1927)
- Irene implicata Doidge (1924), accepted as Asteridiella implicata (Doidge) Hansf., (1961)
- Irene inermis (Kalchbr. & Cooke) Theiss. & P. Syd. (1917), accepted as Asteridiella inermis (Kalchbr. & Cooke) Hansf., (1961)
- Irene natalensis (Doidge) Doidge (1920), accepted as Appendiculella natalensis (Doidge) Hansf., (1961)
- Irene natalensis var. conferta (Doidge) F. Stevens (1927), accepted as Appendiculella natalensis (Doidge) Hansf., (1961)
- Irene natalensis var. laxa (Doidge) F. Stevens (1927), accepted as Appendiculella natalensis (Doidge) Hansf., (1961)
- Irene nuxiae Syd. (1928), accepted as Asteridiella nuxiae (Syd.) Hansf., (1961)
- Irene peddieae Doidge (1927), accepted as Asteridiella peddieae (Doidge) Hansf., (1961)
- Irene peglerae (Doidge) Doidge (1920), accepted as Asteridiella peglerae (Doidge) Hansf., (1961)
- Irene podocarpi (Doidge) Doidge (1920), accepted as Asteridiella podocarpi (Doidge) Hansf., (1961)
- Irene puiggarii (Speg.) Doidge (1920)
- Irene rinoreae Doidge (1922), accepted as Irenina rinoreae (Doidge) F. Stevens, (1927)
- Irene scabra (Doidge) Doidge (1920), accepted as Asteridiella scabra (Doidge) Hansf., (1961)
- Irene speciosa (Doidge) Doidge (1920), accepted as Appendiculella speciosa (Doidge) Hansf., (1961)
- Irene strophanthi (Doidge) Doidge (1920), accepted as Asteridiella strophanthi (Doidge) Hansf., (1961)
- Irene zeyheri Doidge (1922), accepted as Irenina zeyheri (Doidge) F. Stevens, (1927)

Genus: Irenina F. Stevens 1927 accepted as Appendiculella Höhn., (1919)

- Irenina atra (Doidge) F. Stevens 1927 accepted as Asteridiella atra (Doidge) Hansf., (1961)
- Irenina ditricha (Kalchbr. & Cooke) F. Stevens 1927
- Irenina glabra (Berk. & M.A. Curtis) F. Stevens 1927 accepted as Asteridiella glabra (Berk. & M.A. Curtis) Hansf., (1961)
- Irenina implicata (Doidge) F. Stevens 1927 accepted as Asteridiella implicata (Doidge) Hansf., (1961)
- Irenina heudeloti (Gaillard) F. Stevens 1927
- Irenina rinoreae (Doidge) F. Stevens 1927
- Irenina scabra (Doidge) F. Stevens 1927 accepted as Asteridiella scabra (Doidge) Hansf., (1961)
- Irenina strophanthi (Doidge) F. Stevens 1927 accepted as Asteridiella strophanthi (Doidge) Hansf., (1961)
- Irenina zeyheri (Doidge) F. Stevens 1927

Genus: Irenopsis F. Stevens 1927

- Irenopsis bosciae (Doidge) F. Stevens 1927
- Irenopsis claviculata (Doidge) F. Stevens 1927
- Irenopsis comata (Doidge) F. Stevens 1927
- Irenopsis zehneriae (Van der Byl) F. Stevens 1927

Genus: Irpex Fr. 1825

- Irpex africanus Van der Byl 1934
- Irpex deformis Schrad. ex Fr. 1828 accepted as Schizopora paradoxa (Schrad.) Donk, (1967)
- Irpex flavus Klotzsch 1833 accepted as Flavodon flavus (Klotzsch) Ryvarden, (1973)
- Irpex fuscoviolaceus (Ehrenb.) Fr. [as fusco-violaceus] 1828, accepted as Trichaptum fuscoviolaceum (Ehrenb.) Ryvarden [as fusco-violaceus],(1972)
- Irpex grossus Kalchbr. 1881
- Irpex lacteus (Fr.) Fr. 1828
- Irpex modestus Berk. ex Cooke 1891 accepted as Pseudolagarobasidium modestum (Berk. ex Cooke) Nakasone & D.L. Lindner, (2012)
- Irpex obliquus (Schrad.) Fr. 1828 accepted as Schizopora paradoxa (Schrad.) Donk, (1967)
- Irpex tabacinus Berk. & M.A. Curtis ex Fr. 1851, accepted as Hymenochaete odontoides S.H. He & Y.C. Dai, (2012)
- Irpex vellereus Berk. & Broome 1873

== Is ==
Genus: Isaria Pers. 1794

- Isaria coralloidea Kalchbr. & Cooke 1880
- Isaria psychidae Pole-Evans 1912
- Isaria sp.

Genus: Isariopsis Fresen. 1863 accepted as Ramularia Unger, Exanth. (1833)

- Isariopsis fuckelii (Thüm.) du Plessis 1942
- Isariopsis griseola Sacc. 1878 accepted as Pseudocercospora griseola (Sacc.) Crous & U. Braun, (2006)

Genus: Isidium Ach. 1794 accepted as Pertusaria DC., in Lamarck & de Candolle, (1805)

- Isidium tabulare Ach.*

Genus: Isipinga Doidge 1921 accepted as Asterina Lév., (1845)

- Isipinga areolata Doidge 1921 accepted as Symphaster areolata (Doidge) Arx, (1962)
- Isipinga contorta (Doidge) Doidge 1921 accepted as Asterinella contorta (Doidge) Hansf., (1946)

Genus: Isothea Fr. 1849

- Isothea rhytismoides Fr. 1849

== It ==
Genus: Itajahya Möller 1895

- Itajahya galericulata Möller 1895

Genus: Ithyphallus Gray 1821 accepted as Mutinus Fr., (1849)

- Ithyphallus aurantiacus (Mont.) E. Fisch. 1888
- Ithyphallus campanulatus Schlecht. (sic) possibly (Berk.) Sacc. 1888 accepted as Battarrea phalloides (Dicks.) Pers., (1801)

== See also ==
- List of bacteria of South Africa
- List of Oomycetes of South Africa
- List of slime moulds of South Africa
- List of fungi of South Africa
  - List of fungi of South Africa – A
  - List of fungi of South Africa – B
  - List of fungi of South Africa – C
  - List of fungi of South Africa – D
  - List of fungi of South Africa – E
  - List of fungi of South Africa – F
  - List of fungi of South Africa – G
  - List of fungi of South Africa – H
  - List of fungi of South Africa – I
  - List of fungi of South Africa – J
  - List of fungi of South Africa – K
  - List of fungi of South Africa – L
  - List of fungi of South Africa – M
  - List of fungi of South Africa – N
  - List of fungi of South Africa – O
  - List of fungi of South Africa – P
  - List of fungi of South Africa – Q
  - List of fungi of South Africa – R
  - List of fungi of South Africa – S
  - List of fungi of South Africa – T
  - List of fungi of South Africa – U
  - List of fungi of South Africa – V
  - List of fungi of South Africa – W
  - List of fungi of South Africa – X
  - List of fungi of South Africa – Y
  - List of fungi of South Africa – Z
