= Asteridiella solani =

Scientific classification
- Domain: Eukaryota
- Kingdom: Fungi
- Division: Ascomycota
- Class: Sordariomycetes
- Order: Meliolales
- Family: Meliolaceae
- Genus: Asteridiella
- Species: A. solani

Binomial name
- Asteridiella solani McAlpine

Species of fungus

Asteridiella solani is a species of fungus in the family Meliolaceae, first described by Daniel McAlpine in 1897, who gave the following description:

On upper and under surfaces of leaves, leaf-stalks and branches; forming densely crowded, minute, black, generally orbicular, often confluent, easily detachable, brittle crusts, with surface of leaf beneath of a pale brown or pale reddish colour. Mycelium composed of an interosculating network of delicate, colourless, septate, luxuriantly branched hyphae, about 3 μ broad, and attached to matrix, gradually passing into the stouter coloured hyphae above it. Coloured hyphae dark brown, rigid, thick-walled, closely interwoven, septate, branched, 8-9½ μ broad, ultimate branchlets generally 1-septate, knobbed and paler in colour. Perithecia seated on crust in clusters, depressedly globose, black, rough with warty spines, 130-330 μ, the latter being the average full-grown size. Asci oblong to cylindrical, 4-spored usually, 38-64 X 13-26 μ (immature). Sporidia brown, oblong, 4-septate, slightly constricted at septa, rounded at both ends, 36-44 x 14-15 μ. Pycnidia globose, golden-brown, opening by circular mouth and wall composed of small polygonal cells 100-140 μ, along with perithecia. Sporules minute, subglobose or oval, hyaline or rarely brownish, 5½ x 3 μ or 4 μ diameter borne, on delicate hyaline, septate, branched hyphae.

On Solanum viride, R.Br.; Tintenbar, N.S.W. (Maiden).
The crusted mycelium is readily removed, and is steel-grey on the attached surface.

The asci when ripe seem to burst within the perithecium, hence the difficulty of getting a mature ascus. The sporidia, which are at first colourless, then greenish and finally brown, often germinate even within the perithecium either from one or more segments. They are stained greenish-yellow by potassium-iodide-iodine, and the other contents of the perithecia are similarly stained.
