= Xenostigme =

Scientific classification
- Kingdom: Fungi
- Division: Ascomycota
- Class: Sordariomycetes
- Order: Meliolales
- Family: Meliolaceae
- Genus: Xenostigme; Syd. (1930)

Type species
- Xenostigme trichophila Syd. (1930)

Species
- X. trichophila X. paradoxa

Genus of fungi

Xenostigme is a genus of fungi within the Meliolaceae family.
