= Ophiomeliola =

Scientific classification
- Kingdom: Fungi
- Division: Ascomycota
- Class: Sordariomycetes
- Order: Meliolales
- Family: Meliolaceae
- Genus: Ophiomeliola; Starb.

Type species
- Ophiomeliola lindmanii Starbäck

Genus of fungi

Ophiomeliola is a genus of fungi within the Meliolaceae family.
