= Asteridiella selaginellae =

Scientific classification
- Kingdom: Fungi
- Division: Ascomycota
- Class: Sordariomycetes
- Order: Meliolales
- Family: Meliolaceae
- Genus: Asteridiella
- Species: A. selaginellae

Binomial name
- Asteridiella selaginellae M.L. Farr

Species of fungus

Asteridiella selaginellae is a species of fungus in the family Meliolaceae, first described by Marie Leonore Farr in 1968. It has been found in Mexico on the leaves of Selaginella pilifera (the resurrection plant).
