= Hypasteridium =

Scientific classification
- Kingdom: Fungi
- Division: Ascomycota
- Class: Sordariomycetes
- Order: Meliolales
- Family: Meliolaceae
- Genus: Hypasteridium; Speg. (1924)

Genus of fungi

Hypasteridium is a genus of fungi in the family Meliolaceae. The genus was circumscribed by Carlos Luigi Spegazzini in 1924.
