= Laeviomeliola =

Scientific classification
- Kingdom: Fungi
- Division: Ascomycota
- Class: Sordariomycetes
- Order: Meliolales
- Family: Meliolaceae
- Genus: Laeviomeliola; Bat. (1960)

Type species
- Laeviomeliola psidii Bat. (1960)

Species
- L. cassiae L. psidii

Genus of fungi

Laeviomeliola is a genus of fungi within the Meliolaceae family.
