= Metasteridium =

Scientific classification
- Kingdom: Fungi
- Division: Ascomycota
- Class: Sordariomycetes
- Order: Meliolales
- Family: Meliolaceae
- Genus: Metasteridium; Speg.

Genus of fungi

Metasteridium is a genus of fungi within the Meliolaceae family.
