= Pauahia =

Scientific classification
- Kingdom: Fungi
- Division: Ascomycota
- Class: Sordariomycetes
- Order: Meliolales
- Family: Meliolaceae
- Genus: Pauahia; F. Stevens

Type species
- Pauahia sideroxyli F. Stevens

Genus of fungi

Pauahia is a genus of fungi in the family Meliolaceae.

The genus name of Pauahia is in honour of Bernice Pauahi Bishop (1831–1884), a princess of the Royal Family of the Kingdom of Hawaii and a well known philanthropist. It was published in Mus. Bull. Vol.19 on page 17 in 1925 by Frank Lincoln Stevens.
