= Urupe =

Scientific classification
- Kingdom: Fungi
- Division: Ascomycota
- Class: Sordariomycetes
- Order: Meliolales
- Family: Meliolaceae
- Genus: Urupe; Viégas (1944)

Type species
- Urupe guaduae Viégas (1944)

Genus of fungi

Urupe is a genus of fungi within the Meliolaceae family. This is a monotypic genus, containing the single species Urupe guaduae.
