= Ectendomeliola =

Scientific classification
- Kingdom: Fungi
- Division: Ascomycota
- Class: Sordariomycetes
- Order: Meliolales
- Family: Meliolaceae
- Genus: Ectendomeliola; Hosag. & D.K. Agarwal

Genus of fungi

Ectendomeliola is a genus of fungi in the family Meliolaceae.
