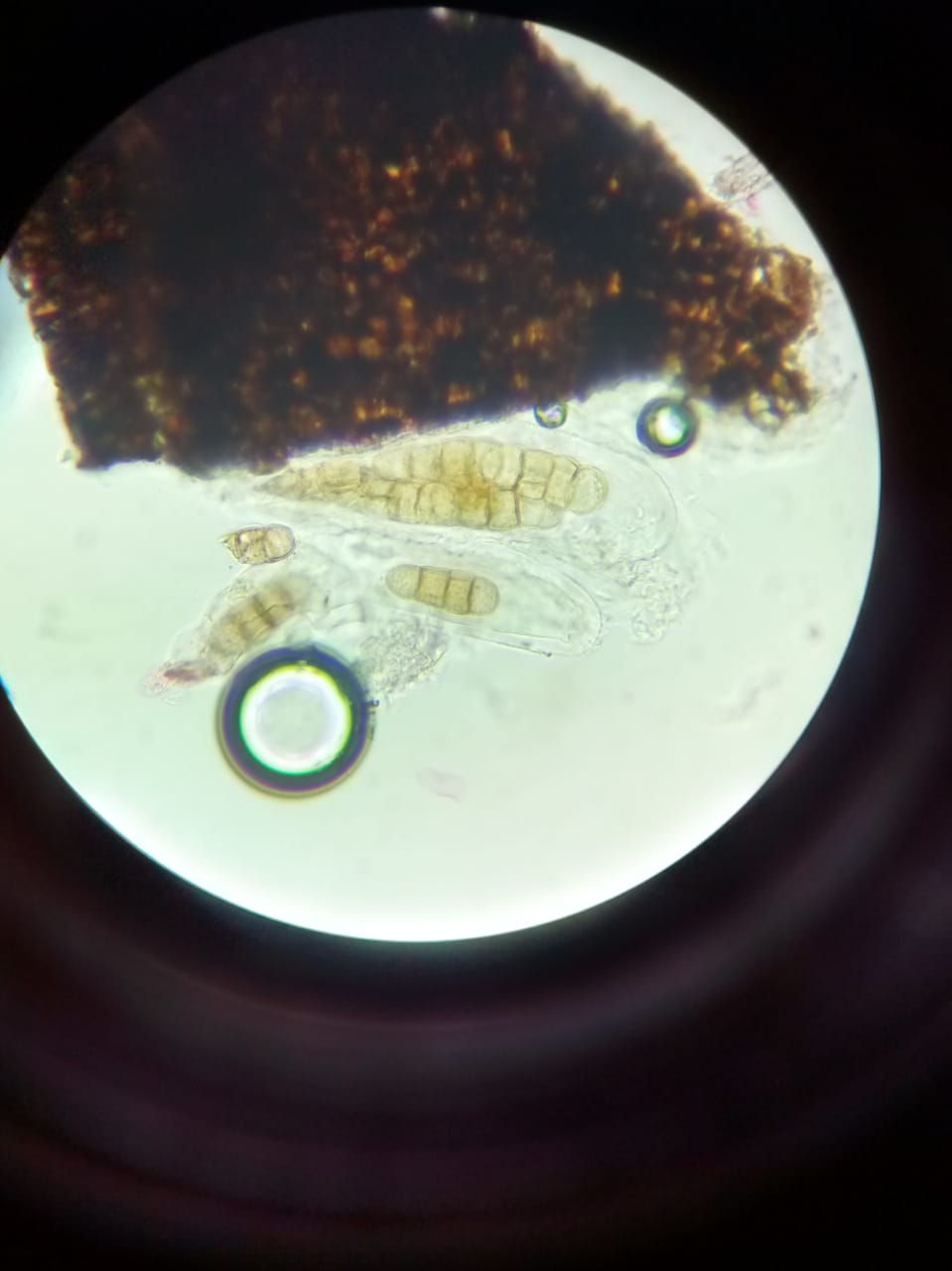
- Leptosphaerulina sp.

Scientific classification
- Kingdom: Fungi
- Division: Ascomycota
- Class: Dothideomycetes
- Order: Pleosporales
- Family: Pleosporaceae
- Genus: Leptosphaerulina; McAlpine

Type species
- Leptosphaerulina australis McAlpine

= Leptosphaerulina =

Genus of fungi

Leptosphaerulina is a genus of fungi in the class Dothideomycetes. The relationship of this taxon to other taxa within the class was unknown in 2007 until it was placed within the Didymellaceae family in the Pleosporales order. The genus was first described by Australian plant pathologist Daniel McAlpine in 1902.

Situation: A range of cool season grasses.

Turf damage: Uniform yellow or brown lesions may extend down to the leaf sheath. Water-soaked lesions, which quickly fade to a bleached white, may also occur on the leaf blades.

Occurrence: Disease outbreaks can occur during warm, humid weather on fescue, ryegrass or bentgrass. Large turf areas become uniformly blighted or appear patchy with individual leaves dying back from the tip.

== Species ==
As accepted by Species Fungorum;

- Leptosphaerulina albulae Crivelli (1983)
- Leptosphaerulina alpina Crivelli (1983)
- Leptosphaerulina americana (Ellis & Everh.) J.H. Graham & Luttr. (1961)
- Leptosphaerulina arachidicola W.Y. Yen, M.J. Chen & K.T. Huang (1956)
- Leptosphaerulina argentinensis (Speg.) J.H. Graham & Luttr. (1961)
- Leptosphaerulina australis McAlpine (1902)
- Leptosphaerulina bataticola Khokhr. & Dyur. (1934)
- Leptosphaerulina brassicae Karan (1964)
- Leptosphaerulina calamagrostidis Pisareva (1964)
- Leptosphaerulina caricis Pisareva (1964)
- Leptosphaerulina coccispora (Norman) Sacc. & D. Sacc. (1905)
- Leptosphaerulina convolvuli Byzova (1987)
- Leptosphaerulina conyzicola L.L. Duarte & R.W. Barreto (2016)
- Leptosphaerulina crassiasca (Séchet) C.R. Jacks. & D.K. Bell (1968)
- Leptosphaerulina cryptomeriae Sawada (1950)
- Leptosphaerulina dracocephali Kalymb. (1961)
- Leptosphaerulina dryadis (Starbäck) L. Holm (1979)
- Leptosphaerulina fontium Scheuer (1988)
- Leptosphaerulina fuliginosa Bondartsev (1921)
- Leptosphaerulina guaranitica (Speg.) Wehm. (1961)
- Leptosphaerulina heterophracta (Nyl.) Sacc. & D. Sacc. (1905)
- Leptosphaerulina hyperborea (Fuckel) M.E. Barr (1972)
- Leptosphaerulina kiusiana Naito (1952)
- Leptosphaerulina kochiae Kalymb. (1961)
- Leptosphaerulina lignicola Panwar & S.J. Kaur (1978)
- Leptosphaerulina longiflori Tennakoon, C.H. Kuo & K.D Hyde (2019)
- Leptosphaerulina macrospora J.M. Liang & L. Cai (2021)
- Leptosphaerulina mangrovei Inderb. & E.B.G. Jones (2000)
- Leptosphaerulina moricola Sawada (1919)
- Leptosphaerulina mycophaga Bat. & J.L. Bezerra (1966)
- Leptosphaerulina myrtillina (Sacc. & Fautrey) Petr. (1959)
- Leptosphaerulina nitida Crivelli (1983)
- Leptosphaerulina obtusispora L.W. Hou, L. Cai & Crous (2020)
- Leptosphaerulina olivaceogrisea Nograsek (1990)
- Leptosphaerulina oryzae (I. Miyake) Phook., Jian K. Liu & K.D. Hyde (2013)
- Leptosphaerulina peltigerae (Fuckel) Riedl (1969)
- Leptosphaerulina personata (Niessl) M.E. Barr (1972)
- Leptosphaerulina phaseolina Bondartsev (1921)
- Leptosphaerulina platycodonis J.F. Lue & P.K. Chi (1994)
- Leptosphaerulina polyphragmia Nograsek (1990)
- Leptosphaerulina potentillae (E. Müll.) Crivelli (1983)
- Leptosphaerulina pulchra (G. Winter) M.E. Barr (1959)
- Leptosphaerulina ricini Karan (1964)
- Leptosphaerulina rupestris Crivelli (1983)
- Leptosphaerulina saccharicola Phook., Jian K. Liu & K.D. Hyde (2013)
- Leptosphaerulina senecionis Crivelli (1983)
- Leptosphaerulina sibirica Chleb. (2002)
- Leptosphaerulina sidalceae Zeller (1935)
- Leptosphaerulina sieversiae (E. Müll.) Crivelli (1983)
- Leptosphaerulina sisyrinchiicola L.W. Hou, L. Cai & Crous (2020)
- Leptosphaerulina trifolii (Rostr.) Petr. (1959)
- Leptosphaerulina vitrea (Rostr.) Woron. (1927)

Former species;

- L. briosiana (Pollacci) J.H. Graham & Luttr. (1961) = Leptosphaerulina trifolii
- L. carinthiaca (Petr.) Crivelli (1983) = Wettsteinina carinthiaca, Dothideomycetes
- L. chartarum Cec. Roux (1986) = Pseudopithomyces chartarum, Didymosphaeriaceae
- L. gaeumannii (E. Müll.) Wehm. (1961) = Leptosphaerulina australis
- L. japonica Kasai (1917) = Sydowia japonica, Dothioraceae
- L. mucosa (Speg.) Wehm. (1961) = Sporidesmium mucosum, Pleosporomycetidae
- L. nigritella (Nyl.) Sacc. & D. Sacc. (1905) = Merismatium nigritellum, Verrucariaceae
- L. oryzae (I. Miyake) Karan (1964) = Phaeosphaeria oryzae, Phaeosphaeriaceae
- L. sojicola (Miura) Byzova (1987) = Pleosphaerulina sojicola, Saccotheciaceae
- L. vignae Tehon & G.L. Stout (1928) = Leptosphaerulina trifolii
