= Asteridiella =

Scientific classification
- Kingdom: Fungi
- Division: Ascomycota
- Class: Sordariomycetes
- Order: Meliolales
- Family: Meliolaceae
- Genus: Asteridiella; McAlpine (1897)

Type species
- Asteridiella solani McAlpine (1897)

Genus of fungi

Asteridiella is a genus of fungi in the family Meliolaceae. The genus was circumscribed by Daniel McAlpine in 1897, who differentiated it from various other fungal genera:

"Asterula, Sacc, has continuous hyaline spores (Hyalosporae), Asteronia, Sacc, has continuous brown spores (Phaeosporae). Asterina, Lev., has two-celled hyaline spores (Hyalodidymae). Asterella, Sacc, has two-celled brown spores (Phaeodidymae). Asteridium, Sacc, has multi-septate hyaline spores (Hyalophragmiae). And in the case of the specimen on Solanum viride with multi-septate brown spores, I have ventured to use Asteridiella (Phaeophragmiae)".

Species and subspecies include some 738 taxa:

- Asteridiella perseae
- Asteridiella selaginellae
- Asteridiella solani
