= Parasteridium =

Scientific classification
- Kingdom: Fungi
- Division: Ascomycota
- Class: Sordariomycetes
- Order: Meliolales
- Family: Meliolaceae
- Genus: Parasteridium; Speg.

Genus of fungi

Parasteridium is a genus of fungi within the Meliolaceae family. The genus was first described by Spegazzini in 1923.
