= Prataprajella =

Scientific classification
- Kingdom: Fungi
- Division: Ascomycota
- Class: Sordariomycetes
- Order: Meliolales
- Family: Meliolaceae
- Genus: Prataprajella; Hosag.

Type species
- Prataprajella turpiniicola (Hosag.) Hosag.

Genus of fungi

Prataprajella is a genus of fungi within the Meliolaceae family.
