= Ophioirenina =

Scientific classification
- Kingdom: Fungi
- Division: Ascomycota
- Class: Sordariomycetes
- Order: Meliolales
- Family: Meliolaceae
- Genus: Ophioirenina; Sawada & W. Yamam.

Type species
- Ophioirenina theae Sawada & W. Yamam.

Genus of fungi

Ophioirenina is a genus of fungi in the family Meliolaceae.
