= Ophiociliomyces =

Scientific classification
- Kingdom: Fungi
- Division: Ascomycota
- Class: Sordariomycetes
- Order: Meliolales
- Family: Meliolaceae
- Genus: Ophiociliomyces; Bat. & I.H. Lima

Type species
- Ophiociliomyces bauhiniae Bat. & I.H. Lima

Genus of fungi

Ophiociliomyces is a genus of fungi within the Meliolaceae family.
