= Peperomia obruenda =

Scientific classification
- Kingdom: Plantae
- Clade: Tracheophytes
- Clade: Angiosperms
- Clade: Magnoliids
- Order: Piperales
- Family: Piperaceae
- Genus: Peperomia
- Species: P. obruenda

Binomial name
- Peperomia obruenda Trel.

Species of plant

Peperomia obruenda is a species of terrestrial or epiphytic herb in the genus Peperomia that is native to Peru. It grows on wet tropical biomes. Its conservation status is Threatened.

== Description ==
The type specimen were collected at Chalhuapuquio, Peru.

Peperomia obruenda is a somewhat small, erect, glabrous herb with a stem 1–2 mm thick. The leaves are obovate-oblanceolate, obtuse to acuminate, with a cuneate base, measuring 3.5–4.5 cm long and 1.5–2 cm wide. They are pinnately about 7-nerved from near the base, papery when dry, and paler on the underside. The slender petiole is 10 mm long. The spikes are terminal and from the upper axils, 60 mm long and 2 mm thick, densely flowered, and borne on a filiform peduncle 2–3 cm long. The floral bracts are round-peltate and undulate.

== Taxonomy and naming ==
It was described in 1936 by William Trelease in Publications of the Field Museum of Natural History, Botanical Series 13, from specimens collected by Frank Lincoln Stevens.

The epithet is derived from the Latin for "to be overwhelmed", referring to the densely flowered spikes or the plant's habit of growing in shaded, overshadowed locations.

== Distribution and habitat ==
It is native to Peru. It grows as a terrestrial or epiphytic herb. It grows on wet tropical biomes.

== Conservation ==
This species is assessed as Threatened, in a preliminary report.
