= Irenopsis =

Scientific classification
- Kingdom: Fungi
- Division: Ascomycota
- Class: Sordariomycetes
- Order: Meliolales
- Family: Meliolaceae
- Genus: Irenopsis; F.Stevens (1927)

Type species
- Irenopsis tortuosa (G.Winter) F.Stevens

Genus of fungi

Irenopsis is a genus of fungi in the family Meliolaceae. The genus was circumscribed by mycologist Frank Lincoln Stevens in 1927.
