= Endomeliola =

Scientific classification
- Kingdom: Fungi
- Division: Ascomycota
- Class: Sordariomycetes
- Order: Meliolales
- Family: Meliolaceae
- Genus: Endomeliola; S. Hughes & Piroz.

Type species
- Endomeliola dingleyae S. Hughes & Piroz.

Genus of fungi

Endomeliola is a genus of fungi in the family Meliolaceae.
