= Green nightshade =

Green nightshade is a common name for several plants and may refer to:

- Solanum physalifolium, native to South America and widely naturalized
- Solanum viride, native to the south Pacific and naturalized in Hawaii
