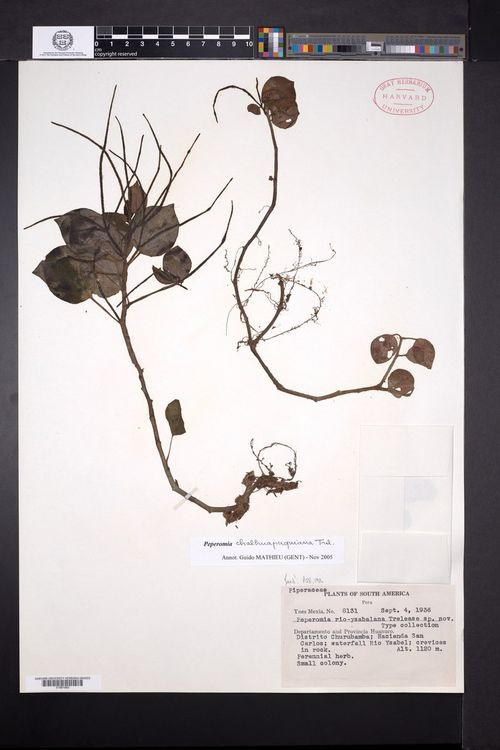

Scientific classification
- Kingdom: Plantae
- Clade: Tracheophytes
- Clade: Angiosperms
- Clade: Magnoliids
- Order: Piperales
- Family: Piperaceae
- Genus: Peperomia
- Species: P. chalhuapuquiana

Binomial name
- Peperomia chalhuapuquiana Trel.

= Peperomia chalhuapuquiana =

Species of flowering plant

Peperomia chalhuapuquiana is a species of epiphyte in the genus Peperomia that is endemic in Peru. It grows on wet tropical biomes. Its conservation status is Threatened.

== Description ==
The type specimen were collected near Hacienda Chalhuapuquio, Peru.

Peperomia chalhuapuquiana is a moderately small, erect, and divaricately branched herb with many branches. The stems are 2–3 mm thick and covered in crisp pubescence. The alternate leaves are ovate to elliptic-ovate, with a bluntly subacuminate tip and a mostly rounded base. They measure 2–4 cm long and 1.5–2.5 cm wide, with ciliate margins. When dry, the leaves are somewhat leathery, paler beneath, and dotted with minute black glands. The petiole is 2–3 mm long (or up to 10 mm) and becomes glabrate. The spikes are terminal and from the upper axils, reaching 100 mm (3.9 in) in length and 2 mm in thickness. The flowers are inserted somewhat loosely, sometimes appearing whorled, and the spike is borne on a slender, glabrous peduncle barely 10 mm long. The berries are subglobose, mucronate, turn black when dry, and have an oblique stigma.

== Taxonomy and naming ==
It was described in 1936 by William Trelease in Publications of the Field Museum of Natural History, Botanical Series 13, from specimens collected by Frank Lincoln Stevens. It got its name from the location where the type specimen was collected.

== Distribution and habitat ==
It is endemic in Peru. It grows on a epiphyte environment and is a herb. It grows on wet tropical biomes.

== Conservation ==
This species is assessed as Threatened, in a preliminary report.
