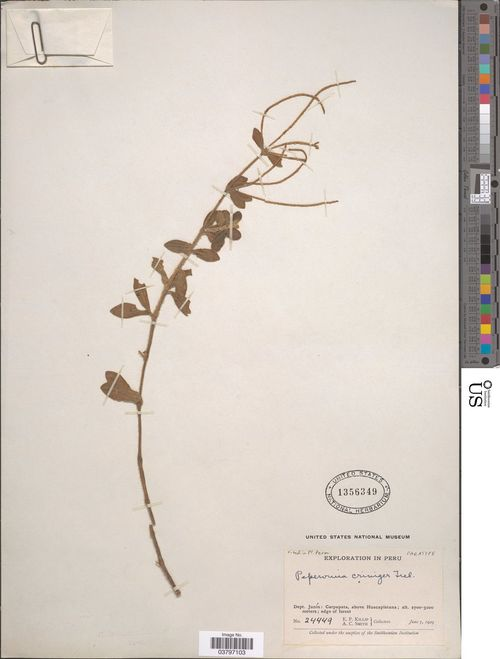

Scientific classification
- Kingdom: Plantae
- Clade: Embryophytes
- Clade: Tracheophytes
- Clade: Angiosperms
- Clade: Magnoliids
- Order: Piperales
- Family: Piperaceae
- Genus: Peperomia
- Species: P. crinigera

Binomial name
- Peperomia crinigera Trel.

= Peperomia crinigera =

Species of flowering plant

Peperomia crinigera is a species of epiphyte in the genus Peperomia that is endemic in Peru. It grows on wet tropical biomes. Its conservation status is Threatened.

== Description ==
The type specimen were collected near Palca, Peru.

Peperomia crinigera is a moderately tall, more or less branched, ascending herb. The stem is 2–3 mm thick and covered with stiff, crisp hairs. The leaves are in whorls of about 5 at the nodes. They are elliptic-subobovate, obtuse, with a somewhat acute base, measuring 10–16 mm long and 6–8 mm wide. The leaves are obscurely 3-nerved and covered with crisp, hispid hairs. The crisp-pilose petiole is about 3 mm long. The spikes are terminal and from the upper axils, reaching 60 mm in length and 1 mm in thickness, with loosely inserted flowers. The peduncle is 1–2 cm long and also covered with stiff, crisp hairs.

== Taxonomy and naming ==
It was described in 1936 by William Trelease in Publications of the Field Museum of Natural History, Botanical Series 13, from specimens collected by Frank Lincoln Stevens. It got its epithet from the Latin wikt:crinis + wikt:gero, meaning "hair-bearing".

== Distribution and habitat ==
It is endemic in Peru. It grows on a epiphyte environment and is a herb. It grows on wet tropical biomes.

== Conservation ==
This species is assessed as Threatened, in a preliminary report.
