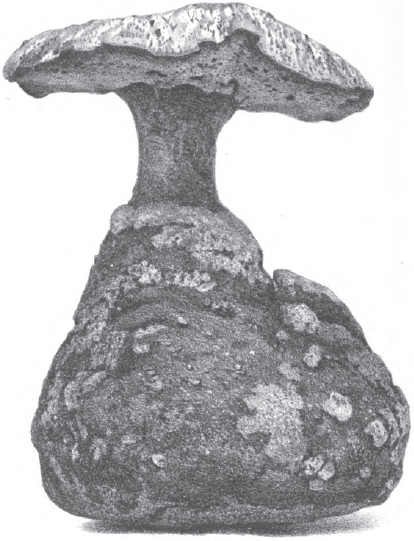
- Laccocephalum basilapidoides

Scientific classification
- Domain: Eukaryota
- Kingdom: Fungi
- Division: Basidiomycota
- Class: Agaricomycetes
- Order: Polyporales
- Family: Polyporaceae
- Genus: Laccocephalum; McAlpine & Tepper (1895)

Type species
- Laccocephalum basilapidoides McAlpine & Tepper (1895)

Species
- L. basilapidoides L. hartmannii L. mylittae L. sclerotinum L. tumulosum

= Laccocephalum =

Genus of fungi

Laccocephalum is a genus of fungi in the family Polyporaceae. The genus was discovered in 1895 by Daniel McAlpine and Otto Tepper. The genus name combines the Ancient Greek words λάκκος ("cistern") and κεφαλή ("head").

== Species ==
- Laccocephalum basilapidoides McAlpine & Tepper (1895)
- Laccocephalum hartmannii (Cooke) Núñez & Ryvarden (1995) – Lord Howe Island
- Laccocephalum mylittae (Cooke & Massee) Núñez & Ryvarden (1995) – Australia
- Laccocephalum sclerotinum (Rodway) Núñez & Ryvarden (1995)
- Laccocephalum tumulosum (Cooke & Massee) Núñez & Ryvarden (1995) – Australia
