= Ceratospermopsis =

Scientific classification
- Kingdom: Fungi
- Division: Ascomycota
- Class: Sordariomycetes
- Order: Meliolales
- Family: Meliolaceae
- Genus: Ceratospermopsis; Bat. (1951)

Species
- C. cupaniae C. xylopiae

Genus of fungi

Ceratospermopsis is a genus of fungi in the family Meliolaceae. It was circumscribed by Brazilian mycologist Augusto Chaves Batista in 1951.
