= Amazonia (fungus) =

Scientific classification
- Kingdom: Fungi
- Division: Ascomycota
- Class: Sordariomycetes
- Order: Meliolales
- Family: Meliolaceae
- Genus: Amazonia; Theiss.

Type species
- Amazonia psychotriae (Henn.) Theiss.

Genus of fungi

Amazonia is a genus of fungi in the family Meliolaceae.
