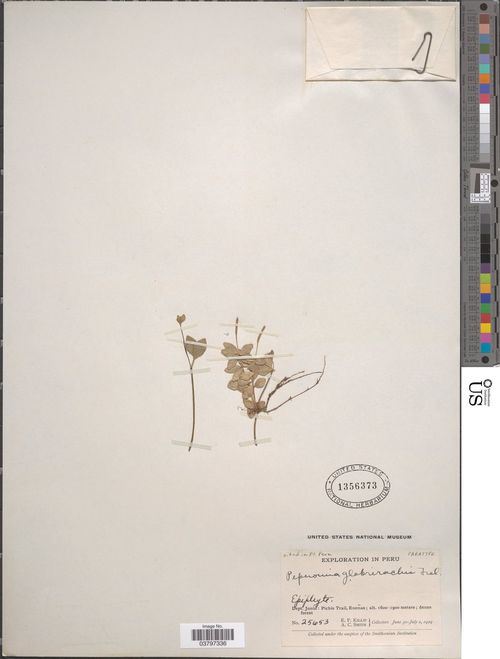

Scientific classification
- Kingdom: Plantae
- Clade: Tracheophytes
- Clade: Angiosperms
- Clade: Magnoliids
- Order: Piperales
- Family: Piperaceae
- Genus: Peperomia
- Species: P. glabrirhachis

Binomial name
- Peperomia glabrirhachis Trel.

= Peperomia glabrirhachis =

Species of epiphyte

Peperomia glabrirhachis is a species of epiphyte in the genus Peperomia that is native to Peru. It grows on wet tropical biomes. Its conservation status is Threatened.

== Description ==
The type specimen were collected near Huancabamba, Peru.

Peperomia glabrirhachis is a moderately small, stoloniferous, tufted herb. The stem is 1–2 mm thick, angled, and sparsely covered with retrorse hairs. The leaves are in whorls of about 4 at the nodes. They are somewhat rhombic-elliptic to obovate, obtuse, with an acute base, measuring 10 mm long and 5–6 mm wide. The leaves are 1-nerved, revolute, sparsely pubescent beneath, and have a papillose-rugose texture on both surfaces. The petiole is barely 1 mm long. The terminal spikes are 15 mm long and 1 mm thick, glabrous, and borne on a filiform, velvety peduncle about as long as the spike itself. The floral bracts are round-peltate.

== Taxonomy and naming ==
It was described in 1936 by William Trelease in Publications of the Field Museum of Natural History, Botanical Series 13, from specimens collected by Frank Lincoln Stevens. The epithet glabrirhachis is derived from the Latin glaber and rhachis, referring to the glabrous flower spikes.

== Distribution and habitat ==
It is native to Peru. It grows as a epiphyte and is a herb. It grows on wet tropical biomes.

== Conservation ==
This species is assessed as Threatened, in a preliminary report.
