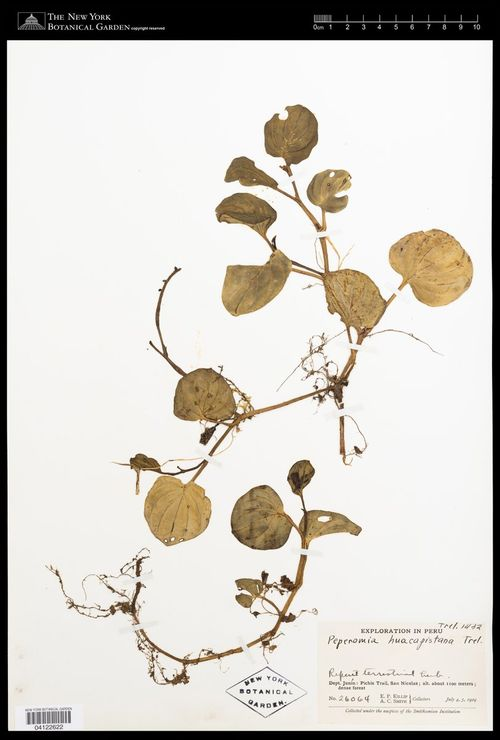

Scientific classification
- Kingdom: Plantae
- Clade: Tracheophytes
- Clade: Angiosperms
- Clade: Magnoliids
- Order: Piperales
- Family: Piperaceae
- Genus: Peperomia
- Species: P. huacapistanana

Binomial name
- Peperomia huacapistanana Trel.

= Peperomia huacapistanana =

Species of flowering plant

Peperomia huacapistanana is a species of epiphytic herb in the genus Peperomia that is native to Peru. It grows on wet tropical biomes. Its conservation status is Threatened.

== Description ==
The type specimen were collected at Huacapistana, Peru.

Peperomia huacapistana is a medium-sized, glabrous, creeping, epiphytic herb with short, erect fruiting branches bearing reduced leaves. The stem is 2–3 mm thick. The alternate leaves are orbicular to ovate or somewhat reniform, with a rounded apex and subtruncate base, measuring 3.5–4 cm long and 2.5–3.5 cm wide. They are 7-nerved, with the inner nerves sometimes confluent. When dry, they are leathery, dark green above and paler beneath. The petiole is 1.5–2 cm long. The spikes can be solitary, paired, or up to 4 or more in a panicle, with the leaves on fertile branchlets reduced to bract-like structures. They are 25 mm long and 2 mm thick, densely flowered, and borne on a filiform peduncle 10 mm long.

== Taxonomy and naming ==
It was described in 1936 by William Trelease in Publications of the Field Museum of Natural History, Botanical Series 13, from specimens collected by Frank Lincoln Stevens. The epithet is derived from the type locality, Huacapistana in Peru, where this species was first collected.

== Distribution and habitat ==
It is native to Peru. It grows as an epiphytic herb. It grows on wet tropical biomes.

== Conservation ==
This species is assessed as Threatened, in a preliminary report.
