= Peperomia profissa =

Scientific classification
- Kingdom: Plantae
- Clade: Tracheophytes
- Clade: Angiosperms
- Clade: Magnoliids
- Order: Piperales
- Family: Piperaceae
- Genus: Peperomia
- Species: P. profissa

Binomial name
- Peperomia profissa Trel.

Species of plant

Peperomia profissa is a species of terrestrial or epiphytic herb in the genus Peperomia that is native to Peru. It grows on wet tropical biomes. Its conservation status is threatened.

== Description ==
The type specimen were collected at Chalhuapuquio, Peru.

Peperomia profissa is a medium-sized, glabrous herb with a stem 2 mm thick (possibly thicker below). The leaves are typically in whorls of 3. They are lanceolate, acuminate, with a somewhat acute base, measuring 4 cm long and 1.5 cm wide, and are 5-nerved. When dry, they are thin and green, paler beneath with minute glandular-granular dots. The slender petiole is 10 mm long. The terminal spikes are 100 mm long and 3–4 mm thick, densely flowered, with a somewhat thick peduncle 15 mm long. The berries are oblong-ovoid, pointed, with a basal pseudocupula and an oblique, apical stigma.

== Taxonomy and naming ==
It was described in 1936 by William Trelease in Publications of the Field Museum of Natural History, Botanical Series 13, from specimens collected by Frank Lincoln Stevens.

The epithet is Latin for "cut open" or "laid bare," referring to the prominently exposed floral structures or the open arrangement of the spikes.

== Distribution and habitat ==
It is native to Peru. It grows as a terrestrial or epiphytic herb. It grows on wet tropical biomes.

== Conservation ==
This species has been assessed as threatened in a preliminary report.
