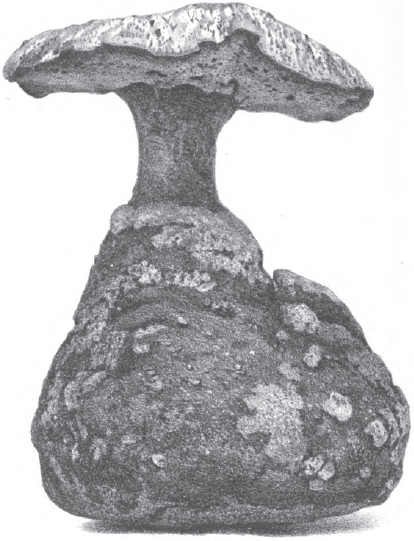
- The sporophore and mycelium of Laccocephalum basilapidoides. The stone-like basal portion shows fragments of roots and the vestiges of an ant tunnel. Collected from the south-eastern border of Australia. Normally found in mallee scrub.

Scientific classification
- Domain: Eukaryota
- Kingdom: Fungi
- Division: Basidiomycota
- Class: Agaricomycetes
- Order: Polyporales
- Family: Polyporaceae
- Genus: Laccocephalum
- Species: L. basilapidoides

Binomial name
- Laccocephalum basilapidoides McAlpine & Tepper (1895)

Synonyms
- Polyporus basilapidoides (McAlpine & Tepper) Lloyd (1912)

= Laccocephalum basilapidoides =

Species of fungus

Laccocephalum basilapidoides, referred to as the stone-making fungus, is a fungus known only from Australia.

== Taxonomy ==
The species was originally described in 1895 by Daniel McAlpine & Tepper. American mycologist Curtis Gates Lloyd transferred it to the genus Polyporus in 1912, but the original name has nomenclatural precedence.

== Characteristics ==
Laccocephalum basilapidoides is a solitary fungus with annual hymenophore. The woody and pitted pileus (13/4-15/4 inches in diameter) is irregularly concave in the middle while convex in the remainder. The pileus is brownish fawn with coffee-colored margin, the inner substance of which, however, is thick, whitish, and unchangeable. Pits are relatively small and conical in the middle whereas larger and elliptical in the surrounding rows. The hymenophore is greyish-fawn to reddish-brown, solid, and continuous with stem, which consists of adnate tubes and large, crowded, and oval pores. The spores are spherical (44-50 μm in diameter), orange-yellow, and echinulate with spines 3 μm long. The fawn stem is compressed oval, 1/2*3/4 inches in diameter and 1 inch in length, which rises abruptly from a whitish mycelium 3 inches in height and 13/4*4 inches in diameter. The mycelium agglutinated grains of the sandy soil to form a stone-like basal portion resembles a concretion of ferruginous sandstone in appearance and almost in density (the whole fungus in the figure weighed as heavy as 13.25 ounces).

Laccocephalum basilapidoides Mycological characteristics
- Pores on hymenium
- Cap is depressed
- Stipe is bare
- Spore print is yellow-orange
- Ecology is saprotrophic
- Edibility is unknown

== Nomenclature ==
The nomenclature of L. basilapiloides is rather weird. It originated from the fungus's stone-like basal portion (basilapidoides = Latin basis base+ lapis stone + Greek οειδής likeness). However, when McAlpine and Tepper first described this species, the name they adopted was actually basilapiloides. Both basilapiloides and basilapidoides were used when Lloyd moved it to genus Polyporus. The term basilapidoides seems to be more accurate in grammar. The commonly accepted scientific name currently is "Laccocephalum basilapidoides" which differs from either McAlpine and Tepper's description or Lloyd's system.

Synonyms:

- Laccocephalum basilapiloides McAlpine & Tepper, 1895
- Polyporus basilapidoides (McAlpine & Tepper) Lloyd, 1912
- Polyporus basilapiloides (McAlpine & Tepper) Lloyd, 1912
