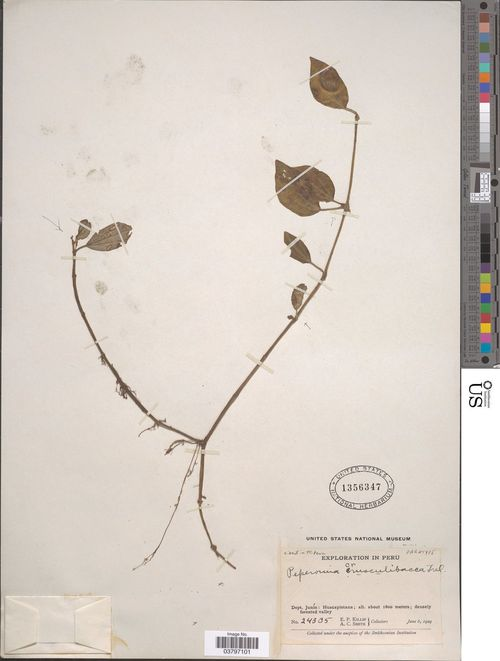

Scientific classification
- Kingdom: Plantae
- Clade: Tracheophytes
- Clade: Angiosperms
- Clade: Magnoliids
- Order: Piperales
- Family: Piperaceae
- Genus: Peperomia
- Species: P. crusculibacca

Binomial name
- Peperomia crusculibacca Trel.

= Peperomia crusculibacca =

Species of flowering plant

Peperomia crusculibacca is a species of epiphyte in the genus Peperomia that is endemic in Peru. It grows on wet tropical biomes. Its conservation status is Threatened.

== Description ==
The type specimen were collected near Huacapistana, Peru.

Peperomia crusculibacca is a moderately tall, ascending herb with a stem 2–4 mm thick covered in crisp pubescence. The alternate leaves are elliptic, somewhat acuminate, with an acute base, measuring 4–6 cm long and 2–3 cm wide. They are 3- or obscurely 5-nerved, glabrous, and dotted with black glands on the underside. The slender petiole is 10–15 mm long and glabrate. The spikes are (possibly terminal and) axillary, filiform, reaching 100 mm (3.9 in) in length, with more or less loosely arranged flowers on slender pseudopedicels. The peduncle is 10 mm long and glabrate. The berries are subglobose with an oblique mucro and have a subapical stigma.

== Taxonomy and naming ==
It was described in 1936 by William Trelease in Publications of the Field Museum of Natural History, Botanical Series 13, from specimens collected by Frank Lincoln Stevens. It got its epithet from the Latin crusculi + bacca, possibly referring to the berries borne on slender, stalk-like pseudopedicels.

== Distribution and habitat ==
It is endemic in Peru. It grows on a epiphyte environment and is a herb. It grows on wet tropical biomes.

== Conservation ==
This species is assessed as Threatened, in a preliminary report.
