= Peperomia pubescentinervis =

Scientific classification
- Kingdom: Plantae
- Clade: Tracheophytes
- Clade: Angiosperms
- Clade: Magnoliids
- Order: Piperales
- Family: Piperaceae
- Genus: Peperomia
- Species: P. pubescentinervis

Binomial name
- Peperomia pubescentinervis Trel.

Species of plant

Peperomia pubescentinervis is a species of terrestrial or epiphytic herb in the genus Peperomia that is native to Peru. It grows on wet tropical biomes. Its conservation status is Threatened.

== Description ==
The type specimen were collected at Hacienda Chalhuapuquio, Peru.

Peperomia pubescentinervis is a rather large but delicate, branching herb with a stem 1–2 mm thick above, bearing a transient, sparse, soft pubescence. The leaves are typically in whorls of 3. They are lanceolate-ovate, acutely acuminate, with a generally acute base, measuring 4–7 cm long and 2–3 cm wide, and are 5-nerved with the nerves confluent for about 5 mm at the base. When dry, they are thin, green, and shiny, with pubescence along the nerves above, and are paler and more or less punctate beneath. The terminal and axillary spikes are filiform, 60 mm long, with somewhat loosely arranged flowers, and are borne on a very delicate peduncle 15–20 mm long.

== Taxonomy and naming ==
It was described in 1936 by William Trelease in Publications of the Field Museum of Natural History, Botanical Series 13, from specimens collected by Frank Lincoln Stevens.

The epithet combines the Latin pubescens and nervis, referring to the pubescence present along the leaf veins.

== Distribution and habitat ==
It is native to Peru. It grows as a terrestrial or epiphytic herb. It grows on wet tropical biomes.

== Conservation ==
This species is assessed as Threatened, in a preliminary report.
