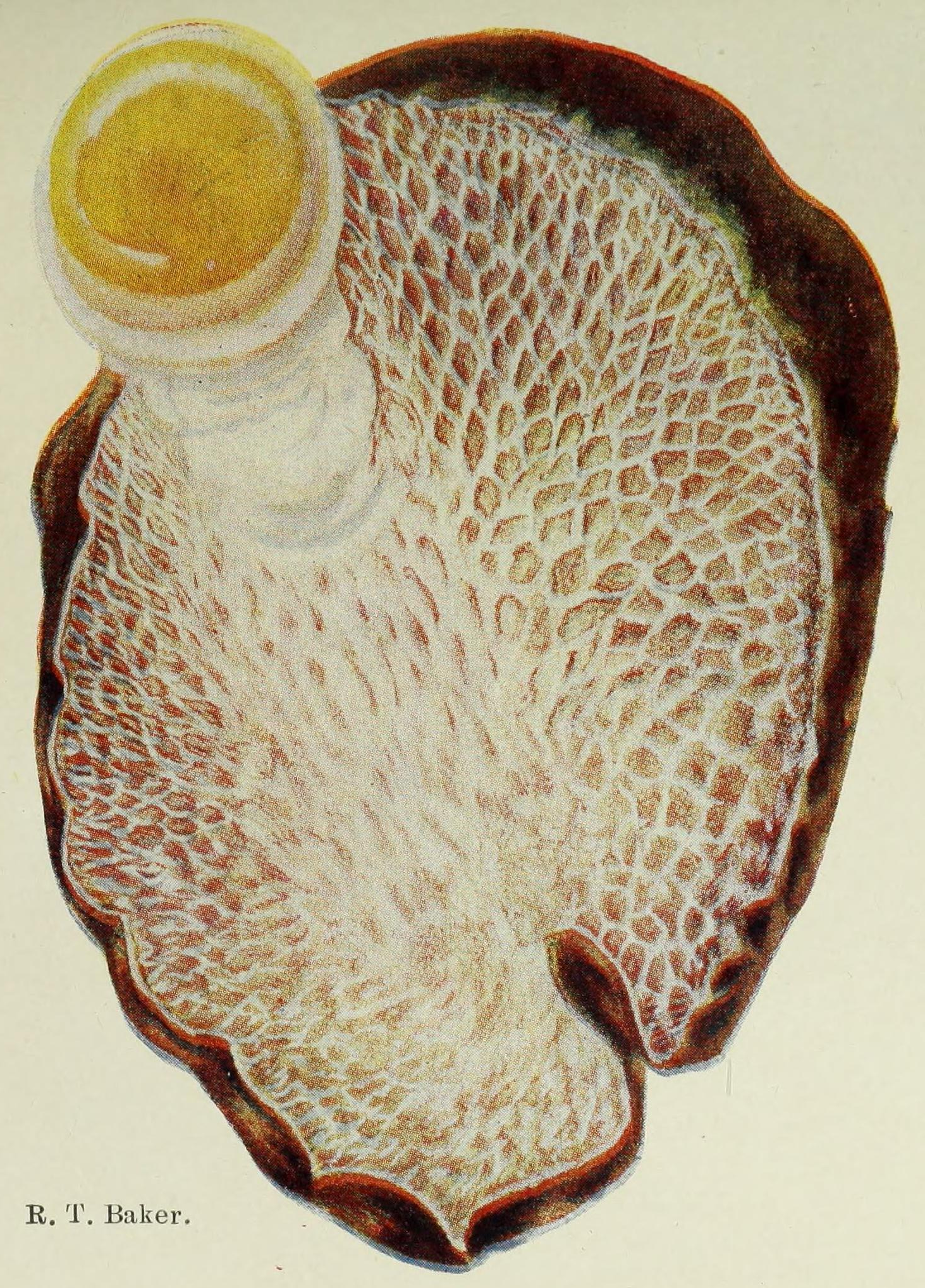
- Reproduction of a watercolour made by R. T. Baker, of the Laccocephalum mylittae sporophore

Scientific classification
- Kingdom: Fungi
- Division: Basidiomycota
- Class: Agaricomycetes
- Order: Polyporales
- Family: Polyporaceae
- Genus: Laccocephalum
- Species: L. mylittae

Binomial name
- Laccocephalum mylittae (Cooke & Massee) Núñez & Ryvarden (1995)

Synonyms
- Polyporus mylittae Cooke & Massee (1892)

= Laccocephalum mylittae =

Laccocephalum mylittae
- Mycological characteristics
- Ecology is saprotrophic
- Edibility is edible

Laccocephalum mylittae, commonly known as native bread or blackfellow's bread, is an edible Australian fungus. The hypogeous fruit body was a popular food item with Aboriginal people.

It was originally described as Polyporus mylittae by Mordecai Cubitt Cooke and George Edward Massee in 1893, before being placed in the small genus Laccocephalum by María Núñez and Leif Ryvarden in 1995.

The bumpy whitish cap has wavy margins and sprouts from an underground stipe. It grows in rainforests and eucalyptus forest. The stipe is attached to a large underground tuber-like fruit body called a sclerotium that Aborigines regarded as a delicacy. The sclerotium can be up to 60 cm (24 in) diameter and weigh as much as 18 kg (40 lb). The Nyungar people commonly consumed the species, which became available in large quantities after fire in karri forest.

Recorded from areas around Perth and from states in southeastern Australia, Laccocephalum mylittae is a large, edible (though not particularly tasty) fungus that grows in rainforest and eucalypt forests. Fungi mappers at the Sunnybrae Restaurant in Birregurra, Victoria, tried a variety of ways to cook a specimen from the Otways in 2008.
