= Appendiculella =

Scientific classification
- Kingdom: Fungi
- Division: Ascomycota
- Class: Sordariomycetes
- Order: Meliolales
- Family: Meliolaceae
- Genus: Appendiculella; Höhn. (1919)

Type species
- Appendiculella calostroma (Desm.) Höhn. (1919)

Genus of fungi

Appendiculella is a genus of fungi in the family Meliolaceae. About 70 species are accepted in 2020.

== Species ==
As accepted by Species Fungorum;

- Appendiculella acaenae Hansf. (1955)
- Appendiculella alchorneae (F. Stevens & Tehon) Hansf. (1961)
- Appendiculella alpina (Togashi & Mentzer) Katum. (2010)
- Appendiculella altingiae Y.X. Hu & B. Song (1996)
- Appendiculella anacardii T.P. Devi & P.N. Chowdhury (2005)
- Appendiculella araliae (Spreng.) Hansf. (1961)
- Appendiculella araucariae Butin & Speer (1979)
- Appendiculella arisanensis (W. Yamam.) Hansf. (1961)
- Appendiculella austrocedri Butin (1974)
- Appendiculella buxi (I. Hino & Katum.) Katum. (2010)
- Appendiculella calophylli (F. Stevens) Toro (1925)
- Appendiculella calostroma (Desm.) Höhn. (1919)
- Appendiculella camerunensis Hansf. (1957)
- Appendiculella castanopsidifoliae (W. Yamam.) Hansf. (1961)
- Appendiculella chiriquiensis Rodr. Just. & M. Piepenbr. (2007)
- Appendiculella compositarum (Earle) Toro (1925)
- Appendiculella cornu-caprae (Henn.) Höhn. (1919)
- Appendiculella cunninghamiae Y.X. Hu & B. Song (1992)
- Appendiculella dombeyae (Hansf. & Deighton) Hansf. (1961)
- Appendiculella echinata (Gaillard) Hansf. (1955)
- Appendiculella echinus (Henn.) Höhn. (1919)
- Appendiculella elaeocarpi Hosag. & P.J. Robin (2011)
- Appendiculella elaeocarpicola Hosag. & P.J. Robin (2011)
- Appendiculella engelhardiae (W. Yamam.) Hansf. (1961)
- Appendiculella erythropali B. Song, T.H. Li & Y.H. Shen (2002)
- Appendiculella eupatorii Meir. Silva, Pinho & O.L. Pereira (2012)
- Appendiculella fitzroyae Butin (1974)
- Appendiculella gaultheriae Hosag., C.K. Biju & T.K. Abraham (2005)
- Appendiculella himalayana R.K. Chaudhary, Kharwar & Budathoki (1994)
- Appendiculella hoveniae A.K. Kar & Maity (1971)
- Appendiculella illicii B. Song (1998)
- Appendiculella kalalauensis Hansf. (1957)
- Appendiculella kiraiensis (W. Yamam.) Hansf. (1961)
- Appendiculella konishii (W. Yamam.) Hansf. (1961)
- Appendiculella labiatarum Hansf. (1961)
- Appendiculella larviformis (Henn.) Höhn. (1919)
- Appendiculella lithocarpicola (W. Yamam.) Hansf. (1961)
- Appendiculella lonicerae B. Song (2002)
- Appendiculella lozanellae Rodr. Just. & M. Piepenbr. (2007)
- Appendiculella malaisiae B. Song (2004)
- Appendiculella malloti B. Song & Y.X. Hu (1997)
- Appendiculella mauensis Mibey (1996)
- Appendiculella megalongensis (Hansf.) Hansf. (1961)
- Appendiculella micheliicola J.C. Yang (1989)
- Appendiculella monsterae Rodr. Just. (2014)
- Appendiculella musyaensis (W. Yamam.) Hansf. (1961)
- Appendiculella natalensis (Doidge) Hansf. (1961)
- Appendiculella neolitseae B. Song (1998)
- Appendiculella nepalensis R.K. Chaudhary, Kharwar & Budathoki (1994)
- Appendiculella photiniicola (W. Yamam.) Hansf. (1961)
- Appendiculella pilgerodendri Butin (1974)
- Appendiculella pyracanthae R.K. Chaudhary, Kharwar & Budathoki (1994)
- Appendiculella quercina T.K. Jana & S.N. Ghosh (2008)
- Appendiculella rimbachii (Pat.) Hansf. (1961)
- Appendiculella rubi Mibey (1996)
- Appendiculella sapindi T.P. Devi & P.N. Chowdhury (2005)
- Appendiculella shettyi Hosag., C.K. Biju & T.K. Abraham (2005)
- Appendiculella sinsuiensis (W. Yamam.) Hansf. (1961)
- Appendiculella sororcula (Speg.) Hansf. (1961)
- Appendiculella speciosa (Doidge) Hansf. (1961)
- Appendiculella splendens (F. Stevens) Hansf. (1961)
- Appendiculella stachyuri Y.X. Hu & B. Song (1993)
- Appendiculella stranvaesiicola (W. Yamam.) Hansf. (1961)
- Appendiculella styracicola (W. Yamam.) Hansf. (1961)
- Appendiculella tonkinensis (P. Karst. & Roum.) Toro (1927)
- Appendiculella tuberculata (F. Stevens) Toro (1925)
- Appendiculella turpiniae (W. Yamam.) Hansf. (1961)
- Appendiculella uapacicola (S. Hughes) Hansf. (1961)
- Appendiculella vaccinii (Hansf.) Hansf. (1961)
- Appendiculella vacciniorum Hosag., C.K. Biju & T.K. Abraham (2005)
- Appendiculella viticis Marasinghe, Hongsanan, Boonme & Hyde (2020)
- Appendiculella vivekananthanii Hosag., C.K. Biju & T.K. Abraham (2005)
- Appendiculella wendlandiae T.K. Jana, S.N. Ghosh & A.K. Das (2005)
- Appendiculella wuyiensis Y.X. Hu & B. Song (1996)

Former species (all Meliolaceae family);

- A. adelphica Syd. (1926) = Asteridiella adelphica
- A. arecibensis (F. Stevens) Toro (1925) = Appendiculella larviformis
- A. calophylli var. apetali Hosag., Kaver., Raghu & Goos (1994) = Appendiculella calophylli
- A. compositarum var. portoricensis (F. Stevens) Seaver & Chardón (1926) = Appendiculella sororcula
- A. doliocarpi Hansf. (1955) = Asteridiella doliocarpi
- A. echinus var. domingensis Hansf. (1955) = Appendiculella echinus
- A. gloriosa (Doidge) Hansf. (1961) = Appendiculella natalensis
- A. larviformis var. major Hansf. (1955) = Appendiculella larviformis
- A. natalensis var. ugandensis Hansf. (1957) = Appendiculella natalensis
- A. natalensis var. ugandensis Hansf. (1961) = Appendiculella natalensis
- A. perrottetiae (F. Stevens) Hansf. (1955) = Amazonia perrottetiae
- A. pinicola (Dearn.) Piroz. & Shoemaker (1970) = Asteridiella pinicola
- A. sororcula var. portoricensis (F. Stevens) Hansf. (1961) = Appendiculella sororcula
- A. styracicola var. minor (Hansf.) Hansf. (1961) = Appendiculella styracicola
- A. tonkinensis var. cecropiae (F. Stevens) Hansf. (1961) = Appendiculella tonkinensis
- A. ugandensis (Hansf.) Hansf. (1955) = Asteridiella ugandensis,
- A. vernoniae (F. Stevens) Hansf. (1955) = Appendiculella sororcula
