= Leptosphaerulina crassiasca =

Scientific classification
- Kingdom: Fungi
- Division: Ascomycota
- Class: Dothideomycetes
- Order: Pleosporales
- Family: Pleosporaceae
- Genus: Leptosphaerulina
- Species: L. crassiasca

Binomial name
- Leptosphaerulina crassiasca (Séchet) C.R. Jacks. & D.K. Bell, (1968)

Species of fungus

Leptosphaerulina crassiasca is a fungal plant pathogen that affects peanuts.
