= Leptosphaerulina trifolii =

Scientific classification
- Kingdom: Fungi
- Division: Ascomycota
- Class: Dothideomycetes
- Order: Pleosporales
- Family: Pleosporaceae
- Genus: Leptosphaerulina
- Species: L. trifolii

Binomial name
- Leptosphaerulina trifolii (Rostovzev) Petr., (1959)

Synonyms
- Leptosphaerulina briosiana Leptosphaerulina vignae Pleosphaerulina briosiana Pleospora trifolii Pseudoplea briosiana Pseudoplea medicaginis Pseudoplea trifolii Pseudosphaeria trifolii Saccothecium trifolii Sphaerulina trifolii

Species of fungus

Leptosphaerulina trifolii is a plant pathogen.

== See also ==
- List of soybean diseases
