= Itajahya hornseyi =

Scientific classification
- Kingdom: Fungi
- Division: Basidiomycota
- Class: Agaricomycetes
- Order: Phallales
- Family: Phallaceae
- Genus: Itajahya
- Species: I. hornseyi

Binomial name
- Itajahya hornseyi Hansf. (1955)

Species of fungus

Itajahya hornseyi is a species of fungus in the family Phallaceae. Found in Australia, it was described as new to science in 1954 by British mycologist Clifford Gerald Hansford.
