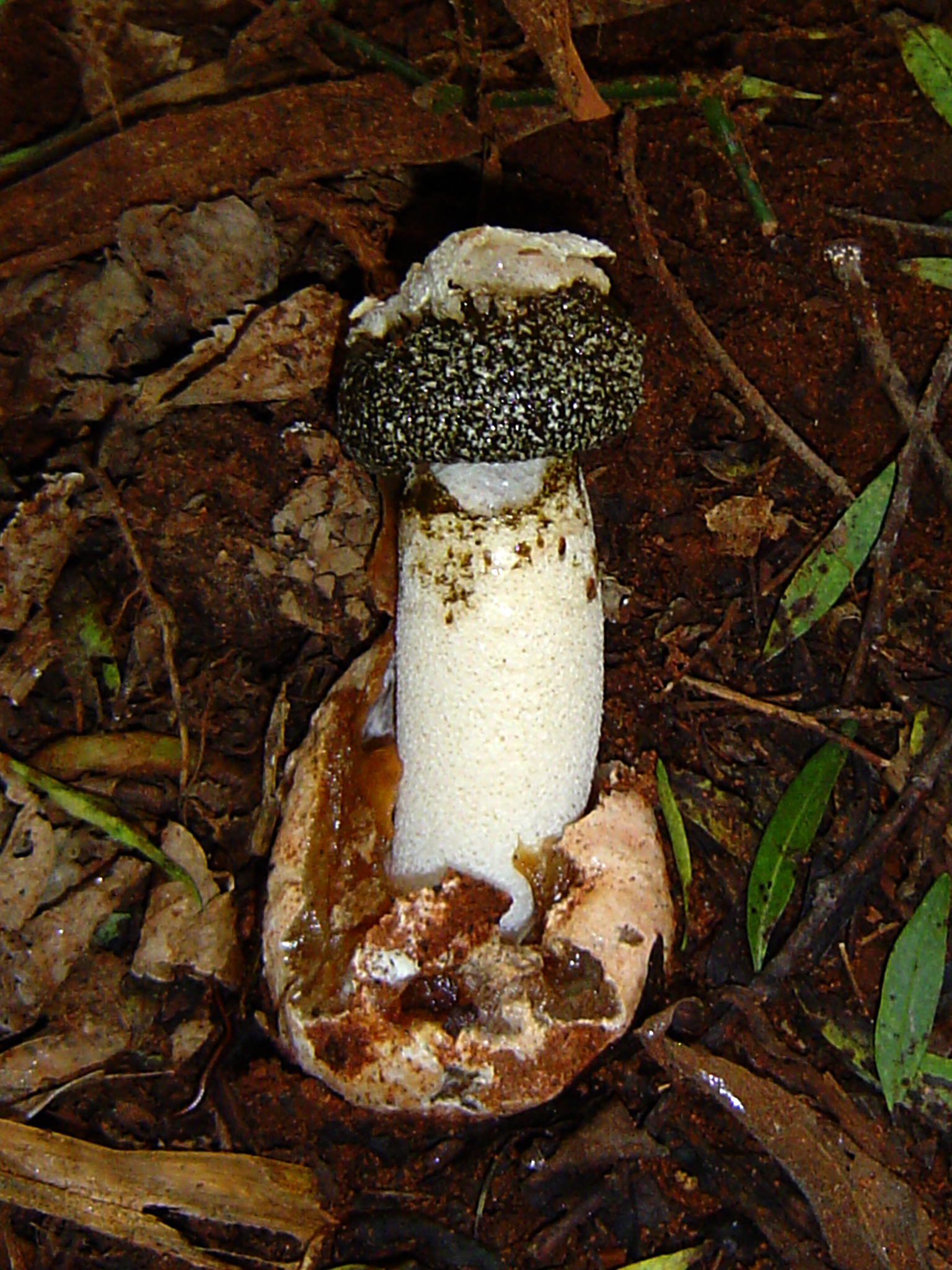
- Itajahya galericulata

Scientific classification
- Kingdom: Fungi
- Division: Basidiomycota
- Class: Agaricomycetes
- Order: Phallales
- Family: Phallaceae
- Genus: Itajahya; Møller (1895)

Type species
- Itajahya galericulata Møller (1895)

Species
- Itajahya galericulata Itajahya hornseyi Itajahya rosea

Synonyms
- Alboffiella Speg. (1898); Itajahya Møller ex Baseia & T.S.Cabral (2013)

= Itajahya =

Genus of fungi

Itajahya is a fungal genus in the family Phallaceae. The genus, widespread in tropical and subtropical areas, contains three species. Characters in this genus include a white calyptra (tissue which covers the top of the fruit body to which the gleba is attached), and lamellate plates covered with gleba. The gleba has a white mottled surface, and the cap appears wig-like when removed of the gleba. The thick, stout stalk has many chambered walls. The species Itajahya rosea, formerly classified in the genus Phallus, was transferred to Itajahya in 2012 when molecular phylogenetic analysis revealed that it was not closely related to other Phallus species.

== Species ==
- Itajahya argentina
- Itajahya galericulata
- Itajahya hornseyi
- Itajahya rosea
