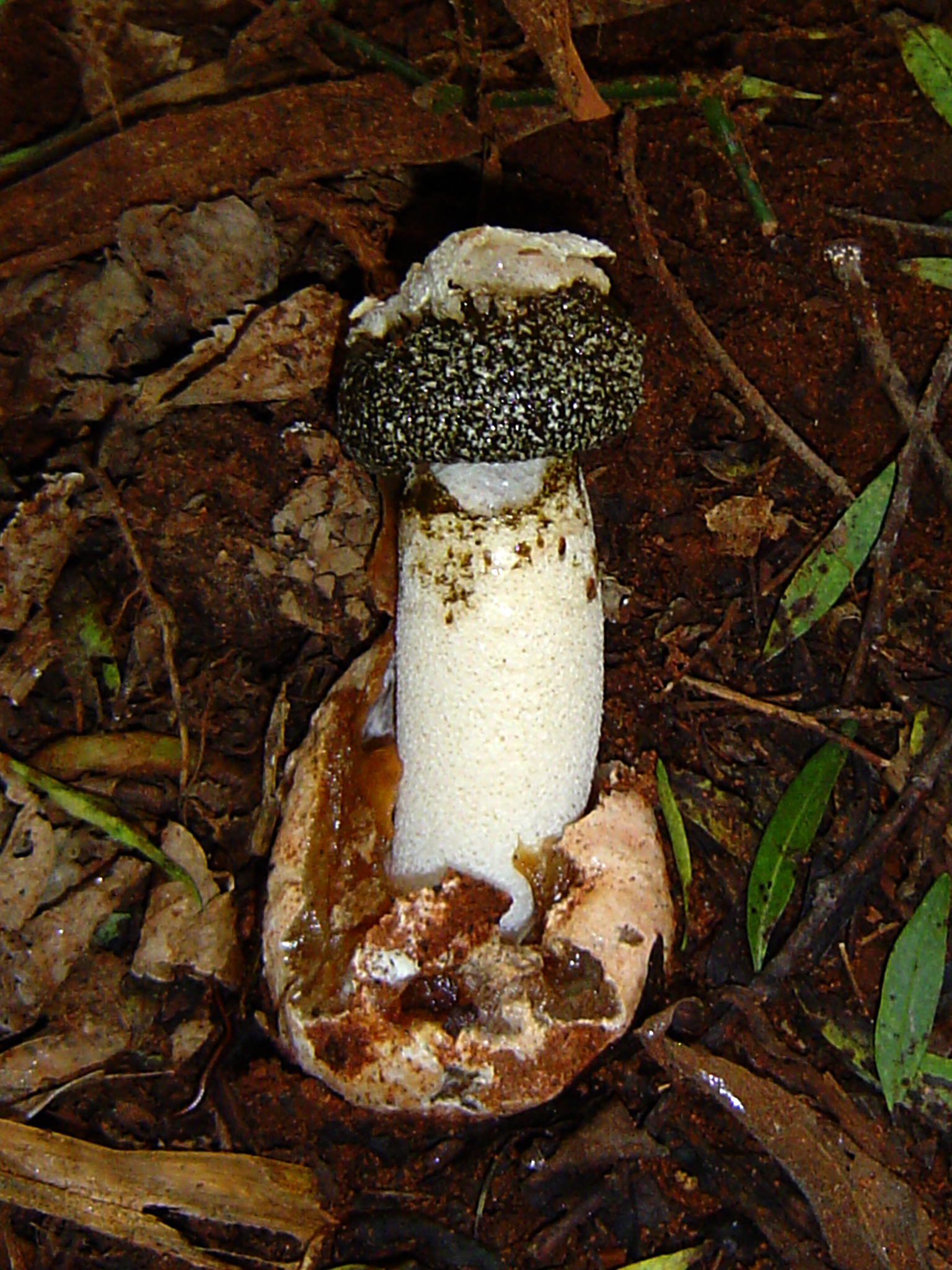
- In Pretoria, South Africa

Scientific classification
- Kingdom: Fungi
- Division: Basidiomycota
- Class: Agaricomycetes
- Order: Phallales
- Family: Phallaceae
- Genus: Itajahya
- Species: I. galericulata

Binomial name
- Itajahya galericulata A.Møller (1895)

Synonyms
- Itajahya galericulata f. typica J.E.Wright (1949); Phallus galericulatus (A.Møller) Kreisel (1996)

= Itajahya galericulata =

Species of fungus

Itajahya galericulata is a species of fungus in the family Phallaceae.

== Description ==
Itajahya galericulta shares these features with other species of the Stinkhorn Family, the Phallaceae:

- the "fruiting body," or sporocarp, arises from an egg-like structure, traces of which may disappear at maturity.
- at some stage of development the fruiting body is covered with a foul-smelling slime.

In this particular species, atop a slender, fleshy or spongy stalk, or stipe, stands a hollow, somewhat egg-shaped or cylindric head, cap, or pileus with a granular surface. The pileus's granular surface is composed of small, wrinkled knots of tissue surrounded by dark brown, sticky "spore slime," the gleba. The spore-containing gleba produces a strong but not stinky odor, maybe like yeasty dough. The main feature distinguishing the genus Itajahya from other taxa in the stinkhorn family is the presence atop the pileus of a patch of whitish tissue, the calyptra, or operculum.

== Distribution ==
Itajahya galericulata is considered to be rarely observed, and one of the lesser-known members of the stinkhorn family. The GBIF distribution map for the species documents occurrences in arid and semi-arid environments in the Americas, southern and eastern Africa, India and Australia.

== Habitat ==
In Australia, Itajahya galericulata is described as inhabiting dry mulga country with an annual rainfall of less than 50cm. In North America it's said to grow gregariously in gardens and cultivated areas. In South Africa it commonly occurs in association with the South American Jacaranda mimosifolia, a tree abundantly planted as an ornamental in gardens and along streets. The fungus may have been introduced into South Africa in pots of Jacaranda mimosifolia.

== Ecology ==
Subterranean mycelia of Itajahya galericulata are " saprobic," deriving nutrition from decayed organic matter. Mature mushrooms may reach 15cm tall (~6 inches).

As with other stinkhorns, the mushroom's smelly gleba attracts insects, the gleba sticks to the insects' legs, and the insects carry spores to new locations where the spores may germinate, ultimately leading to a network of mycelium decomposing organic matter, and that mycelium may possibly produce a new stinkhorn body.

== Taxonomy ==
Itajahya galericulata was first published as a species in 1895, by Möller, in the journal Botanische Mitteilungen aus den Tropen, with the article referenced as "Bot. Mitt. Trop. 7: 79, 148 (1895). In 1996, in Czech Mycol. 48(4): 275 it was designated Phallus galericulatus by Kreisel, but recent studies returned the taxon to Itajahya.

== Etymology ==
The "jacaranda" in the common English name "jacaranda helmet stinkhorn" comes from the South American Jacaranda mimosifolia tree. That species is widely planted along streets and elsewhere in English-speaking South Africa.

The generic name Itajahya derives from the Itajahy River in Brazil where originally it was discovered.

The species name galericulata is from the Latin galericulatus, meaning "provided with a little helmet-like skull-cap (galericulum) or galerum." Clearly this refers to the bonnet-like calyptra atop the pileus.

== Gallery ==
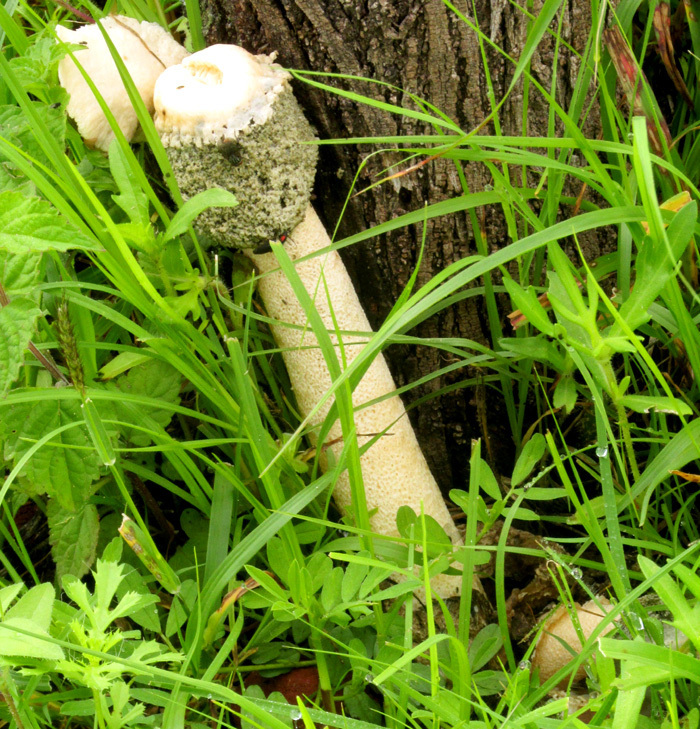
Jacaranda helmet stinkhorn at base of decaying fencepost in highland central Mexico

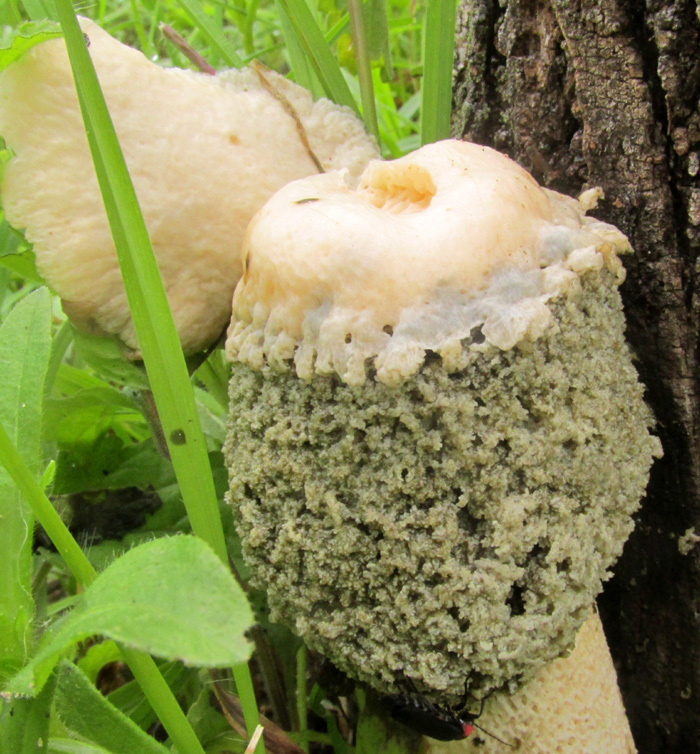
Jacaranda helmet stinkhorn, calyptra atop pileus

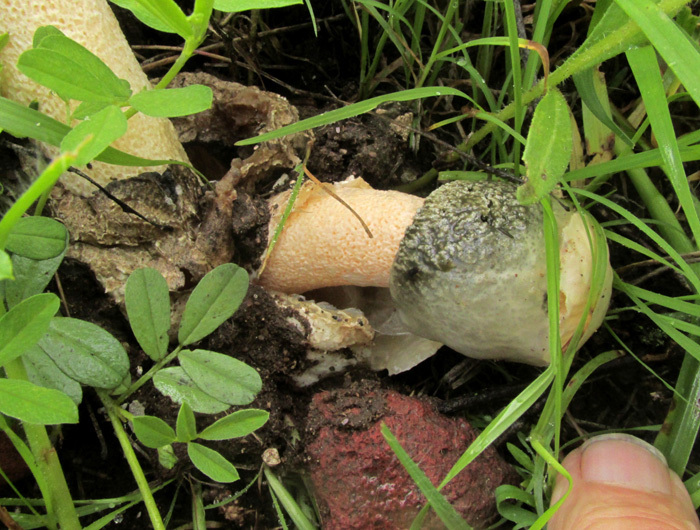
Immature jacaranda helmet stinkhorn at base of larger individual
