= Pleosphaerulina sojicola =

Scientific classification
- Kingdom: Fungi
- Division: Ascomycota
- Class: Dothideomycetes
- Order: Dothideales
- Family: Dothioraceae
- Genus: Pleosphaerulina
- Species: P. sojicola

Binomial name
- Pleosphaerulina sojicola Miura (1921)

Species of fungus

Pleosphaerulina sojicola (formerly known as Pringsheimia sojicola) is a plant pathogen commonly causing spotted decolouration on the leafs of soybeans.
