= Charles Gaillardot =

French physician and naturalist

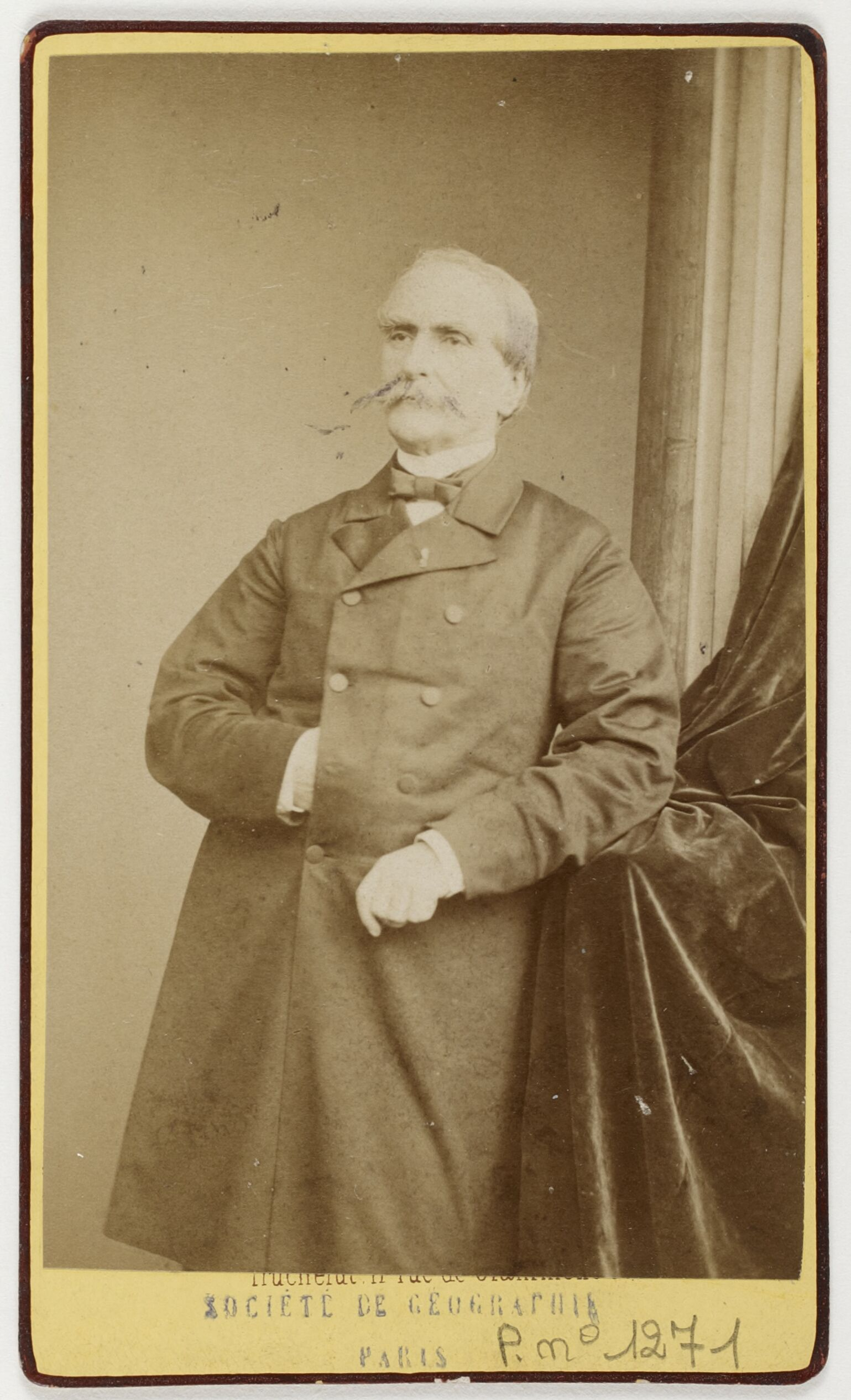
- Born: 20 September 1814; Lunéville
- Died: August 1883 (aged 68); Bhamdoun

Academic work
- Discipline: natural history
- Notable works: Herbier de Syrie

Joseph Arnaud Charles Gaillardot (20 September 1814, in Lunéville – August 1883, in Bhamdoun) was a French medical doctor and naturalist.

In 1837 he was named professor of natural history at the medical school in Cairo, and later on in his career, spent more than twenty years as a physician at a military hospital in Sidon. In 1863 he became a health specialist in Alexandria, then in 1875 was appointed director of the Cairo medical school.

In addition to his medical duties, he conducted botanical, zoological, geological and archaeological research in Egypt and the Middle East. The snail genus Gaillardotia (Bourguignat, 1877; family Neritidae) honors his name, as do species with epithet of gaillardotii, an example being Echinops gaillardotii (Gaillardot's globe-thistle). His Herbier de Syrie became part of the "Herbarium Haussknecht", now located at the University of Jena. In 1854 he became a member of Société botanique de France.
