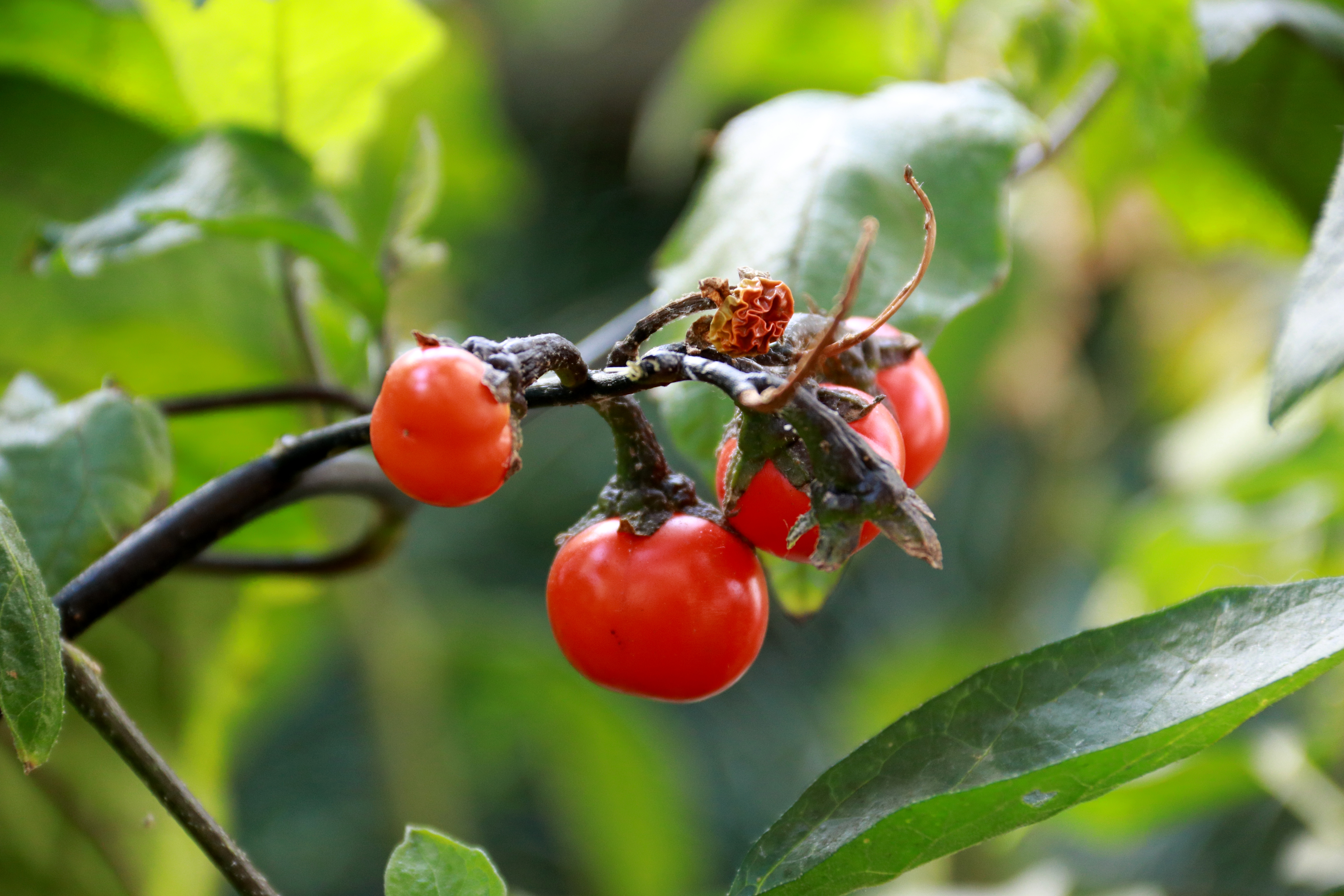
- Fruit at Wilhelma
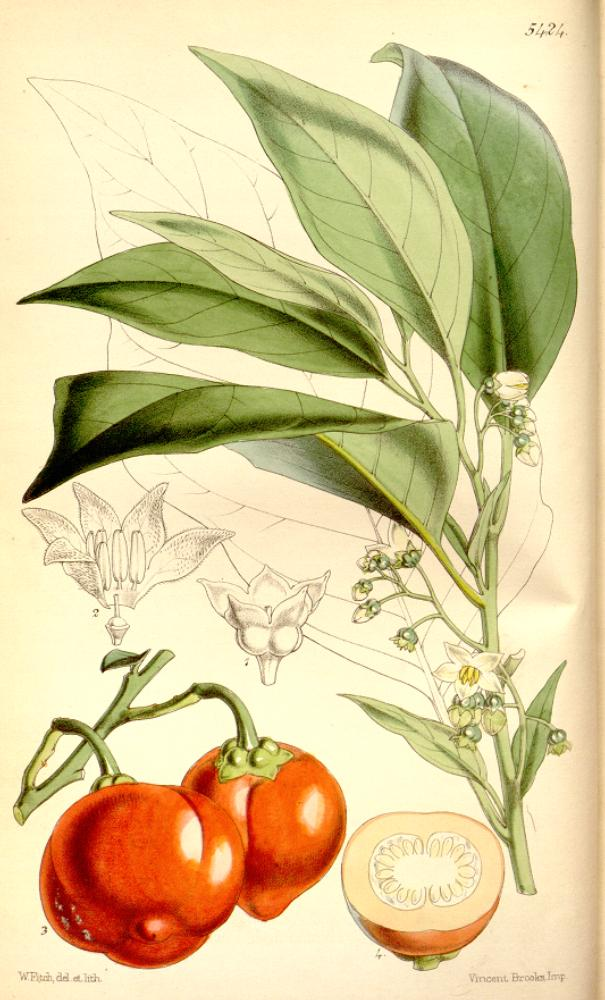
- Botanical illustration

Scientific classification
- Kingdom: Plantae
- Clade: Tracheophytes
- Clade: Angiosperms
- Clade: Eudicots
- Clade: Asterids
- Order: Solanales
- Family: Solanaceae
- Genus: Solanum
- Species: S. viride

Binomial name
- Solanum viride G.Forst. ex Biehler

Synonyms
- List: Solanum anthropophagorum Seem.; Solanum cymosum Banks ex Dunal; Solanum lydgatei H.St.John; Solanum macdanielsii H.St.John; Solanum ornans Witasek; Solanum patameense Witasek; Solanum patameense var. grandifolium Witasek; Solanum patameense var. parvifolium Witasek; Solanum polynesicum H.St.John; Solanum savaiense Witasek; Solanum tongaense St.John; Solanum tuamotuense St.John; Solanum upolense Witasek; Solanum uporo Dunal; Solanum viride Sol. ex G.Forst.

= Solanum viride =

Species of plant in the nightshade family

Solanum viride, the green nightshade, garland berry, cannibal's tomato, poroporo or boro dina, is a species of flowering plant in the family Solanaceae. It is native to the Cook Islands, Fiji, Marquesas Islands, Niue, Pitcairn Islands, Samoan Islands, Society Islands, Tokelau and Manihiki, Tonga, Tuamotus, and Tubuai Islands in the South Pacific. It has been introduced to Hawaii. In Fiji at the time of contact, human meat was cooked wrapped in its leaves, and a condiment for the meal was made from the fruit.
