= Daniel McAlpine =

Scottish - Australian mycologist (1848–1932)

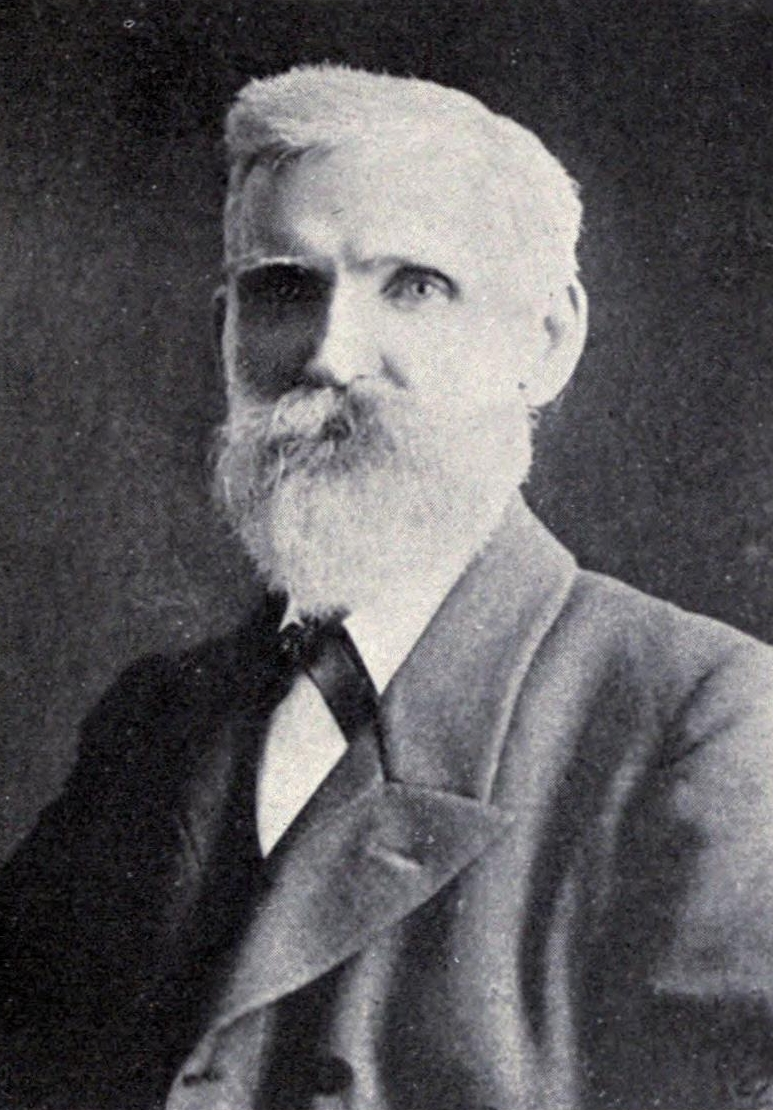
- Born: 21 January 1849; Saltcoats, Ayrshire
- Died: 12 October 1932 (aged 83); Leitchville, Victoria
- Scientific career
- Fields: Botany, Plant pathology, Fungi, Zoology
- Author abbrev. (botany): McAlpine

Daniel McAlpine (21 January 1849 – 12 October 1932) was a Scottish-born Australian mycologist known for his research in plant pathology. He wrote several publications on plant disease in many crops and other plants. McAlpine was a lecturer in biology at the University of Melbourne from 1884, and, with his appointment to the Victorian Department of Agriculture from 1890 to 1911, became the British Empire's first professional plant pathologist.

== Early life ==
He was born in Saltcoats, Scotland, the third son of schoolmaster Daniel McAlpine and his wife Flora. The young Daniel attended Ardeer School, where his father taught. McAlpine graduated from the University of London in 1873, where he attended lectures given by such luminaries as Thomas Henry Huxley (biology), William Turner Thiselton-Dyer (botany), Archibald Geikie (geology), and Robert Etheridge (paleontology). McAlpine was later appointed professor of natural history at the New Veterinary College in Edinburgh, and then lecturer in biology and botany at the Heriot-Watt College.

McAlpine moved to Melbourne, Australia in 1884, six years after his marriage to Isabella Jamieson Williamson. They would eventually have five daughters together. He was appointed to a lectureship in biology at Ormond College, University of Melbourne in 1885. A year later, he became visiting lecturer in botany at the Melbourne College of Pharmacy, a position he held until 1911. McAlpine was appointed to the Victorian Department of Agriculture as a vegetable pathologist. This appointment was made by Alfred Deakin, later the Prime Minister of Australia. He was succeeded in this position in 1913 by Charles Clifton Brittlebank, his assistant from 1908. Brittlebank provided illustrations for several of McAlpine's publications.

McAlpine regularly corresponded with geologist Sir Archibald Geikie, and occasionally with his younger brother James Geikie. McAlpine had a long friendship with David Orme Masson, Professor of Chemistry at the University of Melbourne known for his work on the explosive compound nitroglycerine.

McAlpine died in Leitchville on 12 October 1932.

== Career ==
As vegetable pathologist, McAlpine was tasked with determining the cause of bitter pit, a once economically devastating fungal disease of apples in Australia. Despite his failure, it took another four decades for the necessary scientific knowledge to be developed. He did confirm that neither infectious agents nor poisons were the cause of bitter pit.

== Memberships and honors ==
McAlpine was an honorary member of the Caesarian Leopold-Caroline Academy of Natural Phenomena (1894). He was a corresponding member of the Linnean Society of New South Wales (1902). In 1971 the Australasian Plant Pathology Society started the McAlpine memorial lectures. The first lecture was given by Lilian Fraser at the 2nd National Conference held in Brisbane 12–14 May 1976, was titled "Diseases of Citrus Trees in Australia - the First Hundred Years". The Department of Environment and Primary Industries (Victoria) awards the "Daniel McAlpine Science Award". McAlpine has been called "the greatest figure in Victorian mycology".

Fungus species named in his honour include Amanitopsis mcalpineana Cleland & Cheel (1914), and Hydnangium mcalpinei Rodw. (1924).

== Selected publications ==
In 30 years of research, McAlpine published over 200 papers, monographs, and books dealing with all aspects of the plant pathology, from disease control methods to taxonomic studies of rusts, smuts and other fungi and from field diseases of cereals, citrus, grapes and stone fruit to post-harvest disorders of apples and other produce.

- McAlpine, Daniel (1889). Fungus Diseases of Citrus Trees in Australia. Victoria: Department of Agriculture.
- ———————— (1895). Systematic Arrangement of Australian Fungi. Melbourne: Robert S. Brain, government Printer.
- ———————— (1898). Additions to the Fungi on the Vine in Australia. Victoria, Australia: Department of Agriculture.
- ———————— (1899). Fungus Diseases of Citrus Trees in Australia, and their Treatment. Melbourne, Australia: R.S. Brain, Govt. Printer.
- ———————— (1902). Fungus Diseases of Stone-Fruit Trees in Australia. Melbourne: R. S. Brain, government printer.
- ———————— (1902). "Australian fungi, new or unrecorded". Proceedings of the Linnean Society of New South Wales. 27: 373–379.
- ———————— (1905). "A new genus of Uredineae – Uromycladium". Annales Mycologici. 3 (4): 303–323.
- ———————— (1906). Rusts of Australia (Uredineae). Melbourne: Robert S. Brain, government printer.
- ———————— (1910). Smuts of Australia (Ustilagineae). Melbourne: J. Kemp, government printer.
- ———————— (1911). Handbook of Fungus Diseases of the Potato in Australia'. Vol. 1. Melbourne: J. Kemp, government printer.

== See also ==
- List of mycologists
- Category:Taxa named by Daniel McAlpine
