= Frank Lincoln Stevens =

American mycologist and phytopathologist

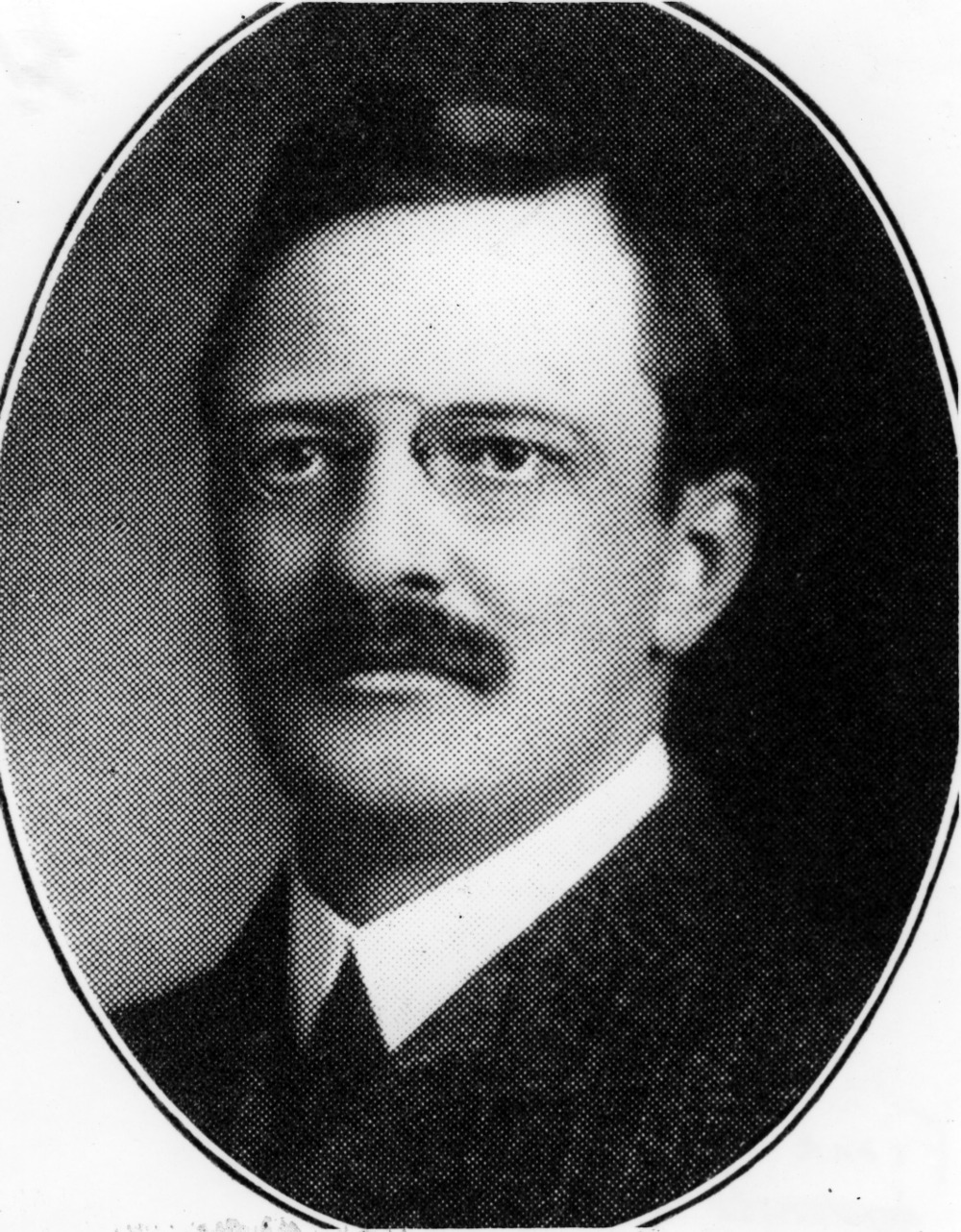
In 1904

Frank Lincoln Stevens (April 1, 1871, Onondaga County, New York – August 18, 1934, Winnetka, Illinois) was an American mycologist and phytopathologist. He gained an international reputation as one of the preeminent mycologists.

== Biography ==
Frank Lincoln Stevens grew up on a farm near Syracuse, New York. He received secondary education at Onondaga Academy. In his boyhood and teenage years he read about science, created a homemade laboratory, and made, within Onondaga County, comprehensive collections of ferns and geological specimens. Without any formal instruction in chemistry, he passed examinations in chemistry at the high school level. He graduated in 1891 with a B.L. from Hobart College in Geneva, New York. With advice from David Grandison Fairchild, whom he encountered at the Agricultural Experiment Station in Geneva, New York, Stevens matriculated at Rutgers University to study botany and, especially, plant pathology. From 1891 to 1893 he was a student assistant at Rutgers and the New Jersey Agricultural Experimental Station. He graduated from Rutgers with a B.S. in 1893 and an M.S. in 1897. In June 1897 he married Adeline Theodora Chapman (1867–1937). She became the first woman faculty member at North Carolina State when she taught biology there from 1902 to 1903. She was the coauthor, with her husband and with Tait Butler (1862–1939), of A Practical Arithmetic (Charles Scribner's Sons, 1909).

Frank L. Stevens taught science at Racine College from 1893 to 1894, taught chemistry and botany at Central High School in Columbus, Ohio from 1894 to 1897, and worked as a sanitary analyst for the Chicago Drainage Canal Investigation from 1899 to 1900. During the time that he and his wife spent in Columbus, Ohio, he was allowed to use the laboratories at Ohio University and became interested in the parasitic fungus Albugo bliti (which is now renamed Wilsoniana bliti). He received, based upon a thesis on this parasitic fungus, a Ph.D. in 1900 from the University of Chicago, after enrolling there as a graduate student and receiving a fellowship in botany from 1898 to 1899. As a postdoc, he received from the University of Chicago a traveling fellowship from 1900 to 1901. The fellowship enabled him to study at the University of Bonn, the University of Halle, and the Stazione Zoologica Anton Dohrn.

At North Carolina State University, Stevens was from 1901 to 1902 an instructor in biology and from 1902 to 1912 a professor of botany and vegetable pathology. For a number of years he was a biologist and the head of the department of plant diseases at the North Carolina Agricultural Experimental Station. During his years in North Carolina he studied Granville wilt and the breeding and selection of various crops having resistance to wilt disease. He coauthored a textbook Agriculture for Beginners (Ginn & Company, 1903) for younger students and the important textbook Diseases of Economic Plants (Macmillan, 1910). While a professor in North Carolina, he collected with John Galentine Hall (1870–1949).

From 1912 to 1914 Stevens was the dean of agriculture at the University of Puerto Rico. In Puerto Rico, he collected fungi and completed his book The Fungi Which Cause Plant Disease (Macmillan, 1913). Prior to 1914 he collected in Trinidad and Tobago, as well as Puerto Rico. In the Caribbean islands his co-collectors were William E. Hess and Nathaniel Lord Britton.

In Puerto Rico, the collection by Stevens from 1912 to 1914 of rusts (fungi in the order Pucciniales, previously known as Uredinales) made a valuable contribution to tropical mycology. In his collection there are 620 numbers of material collected in 1913, 23 collected in 1912, and 7 collected in January 1914. The collection has 18 rust species that were new to science.

At the University of Illinois, Stevens was a professor of plant pathology from 1914 until his death in 1934. During his Illinois professorship he collected in Guyana, Peru, Ecuador, Panama, Costa Rica, the Philippines, and Hawaii. He collected Hawaiian fungi from 1920 to 1921 when he was on academic leave absence as a Bishop Museum Fellow appointed by Yale University.

He was elected in 1899 a fellow of the American Association for the Advancement of Science. He was the president of the American Phytopathological Society in 1910.

== Selected publications ==
=== Articles ===
- Stevens, F. L. (1899). "The Compound Oosphere of Albugo bliti". Botanical Gazette. 28 (3): 149–176. doi:10.1086/327892. S2CID 85039673.
- —— (1903). "Poisoning by Lepiota Morgani Pk". The Journal of Mycology. 9 (4): 220–222. doi:10.2307/3752377. JSTOR 3752377.
- —— (1905). "The Science of Plant Pathology". Journal of the Elisha Mitchell Scientific Society. 21 (2): 61–75. JSTOR 24330491.
- —— (1907). "The Chrysanthemum Ray Blight". Botanical Gazette. 44 (4): 241–258. doi:10.1086/329346. S2CID 86625847.
- —— (1907). "List of New York Fungi". The Journal of Mycology. 13 (2): 67–72. doi:10.2307/3752669. JSTOR 3752669.
- ——; Hall, J. G. (1907). "An Apple Rot Due to Volutella". The Journal of Mycology. 13 (3): 94–99. doi:10.2307/3752839. JSTOR 3752839.
- —— (1918). "Mycology and Plant Pathology". The Plant World. 21 (2): 53–55. JSTOR 43477618.
- ——; Hall, J. G. (1909). "Variation of Fungi Due to Environment". Botanical Gazette. 48: 1–30. doi:10.1086/329933.
- —— (1914). "A Destructive Strawberry Disease". Science. 39 (1017): 949–950. Bibcode:1914Sci....39..949S. doi:10.1126/science.39.1017.949. PMID 17812405.
- —— (1917). "Problems of Plant Pathology". Botanical Gazette. 63 (4): 297–306. doi:10.1086/332026. S2CID 37462379.
- —— (1917). "Spegazzinian Meliola Types". Botanical Gazette. 64 (5): 421–425. doi:10.1086/332169. S2CID 84715981.
- ——; Ruth, W. A.; Spooner, C. S. (1918). "Pear Blight Wind Borne". Science. 48 (1244): 449–450. Bibcode:1918Sci....48..449S. doi:10.1126/science.48.1244.449. PMID 17752103.
- —— (1918). "Some Meliolicolous Parasites and Commensals from Porto Rico". Botanical Gazette. 65 (3): 227–249. doi:10.1086/332230. S2CID 83909007.
- —— (1920). "Foot-Rot of Wheat". Science. 51 (1325): 517–518. Bibcode:1920Sci....51..517S. doi:10.1126/science.51.1325.517. PMID 17794626.
- —— (1920). "New or Noteworthy Porto Rican Fungi". Botanical Gazette. 70 (5): 399–402. doi:10.1086/332764. S2CID 85426640.
- —— (1921). "The Relation of Plant Pathology to Human Welfare". American Journal of Botany. 8 (6): 315–322. Bibcode:1921AmJB....8..315S. doi:10.1002/j.1537-2197.1921.tb05628.x. JSTOR 2435262.
- —— (1922). "The Helminthosporium Foot-rot of Wheat, with Observations on the Occurrence of Saltation in the Genus". Illinois Natural History Survey Bulletin. 14 (1–10): 77–185. doi:10.21900/j.inhs.v14.313.
- ——; Manter, H. W. (1925). "The Hemisphaeriaceae of British Guiana and Trinidad". Botanical Gazette. 79 (3): 265–296. doi:10.1086/333477. S2CID 83484061.
- —— (1928). "Effects of Ultra-Violet Radiation on Various Fungi". Botanical Gazette. 86 (2): 210–225. doi:10.1086/333890. S2CID 121836047.
- —— (1931). "A Comparative Study of Sclerotium Rolfsii and Sclerotium Delphinii". Mycologia. 23 (3): 204–222. doi:10.1080/00275514.1931.12017038.
- —— (1932). "Tropical Plant Pathology and Mycology". Bulletin of the Torrey Botanical Club. 59 (1): 1–6. doi:10.2307/2480458. JSTOR 2480458.

=== Books and monographs ===
- Stevens, Frank Lincoln; Hall, John Galentine (September 1911). A Serious Lettuce Disease (Sclerotiniose) and a Method of Control. Technical Bulletin 8. North Carolina Agricultural Experiment Station.
- —— (1913). The Fungi which Cause Plant Disease. New York: Macmillan Company. ISBN 9780384581005. (1966 reprint)
- —— (April 1916). The Genus Meliola in Porto Rico: Including Descriptions of Sixty-two New Species and Varieties and a Synopsis of All Known Porto Rican Forms. Illinois Biological Monographs, Vol. II, No. 4. University of Illinois.
- —— (July 1923). Parasitic Fungi from British Guiana and Trinidad. Illinois Biological Monographs, Vol. VIII, No. 3. University of Illinois.
- ——; Hall, John Galentine (1921). Diseases of Economic Plants. New York. (revised edition of 1910 1st edition)
- —— (1925). Plant Disease Fungi. New York: Macmillan Company.
- —— (October 1925). Hawaiian Fungi. Bulletin 19. Honolulu, Hawaii: Bernice I. Bishop Museum.
- —— (April 1927). Fungi from Costa Rica and Panama. Illinois Biological Monographs, Vol. XI, No. 2. University of Illinois.
