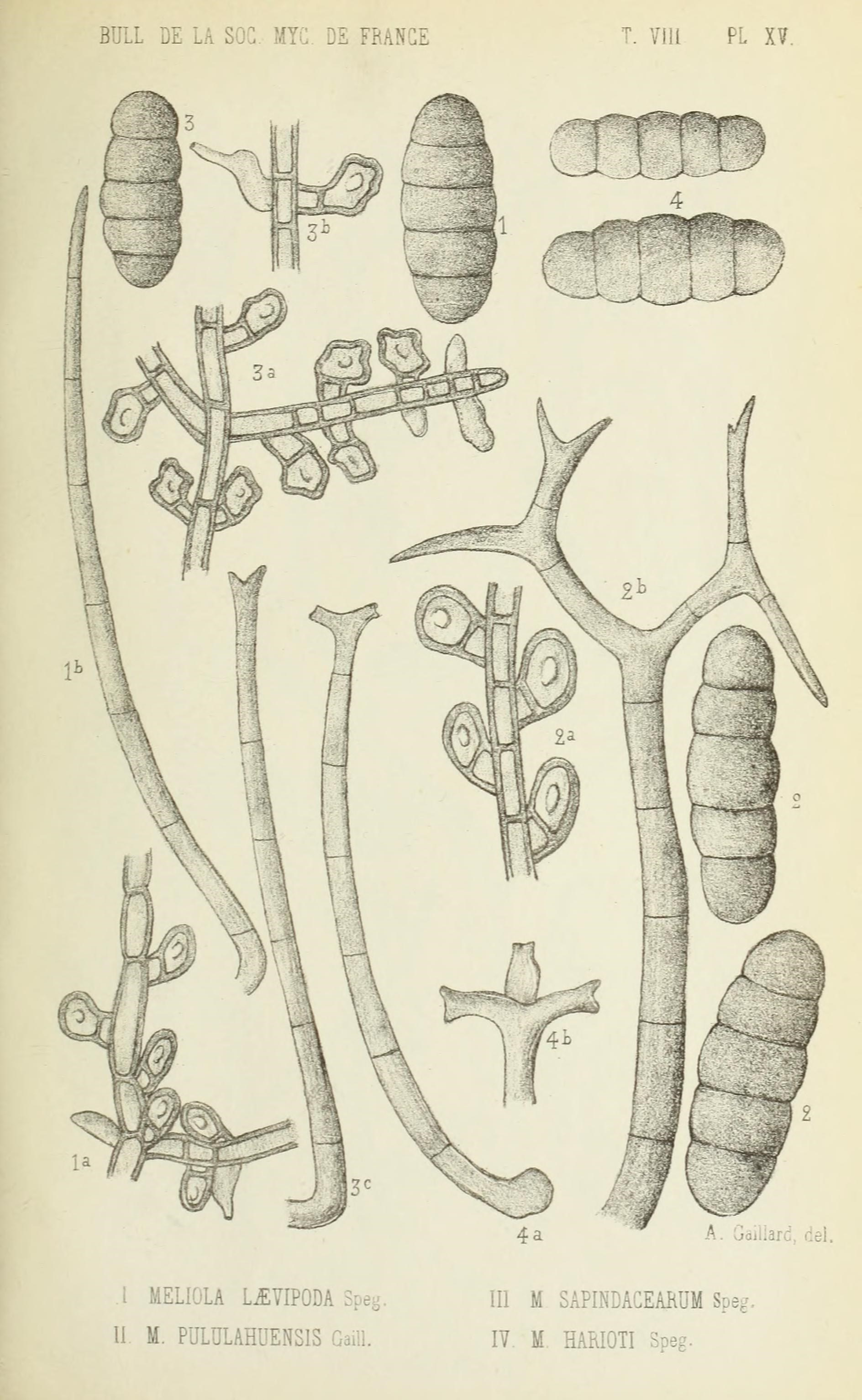
- I. Meliola lævipoda Speg. (now Meliola levipoda) II. Meliola pululahuensis Gaill. III. Meliola sapindacearum Speg. IV. Meliola hariotii Speg.

Scientific classification
- Kingdom: Fungi
- Division: Ascomycota
- Class: Sordariomycetes
- Order: Meliolales
- Family: Meliolaceae; G.W.Martin ex Hansf.

Type genus
- Meliola Fr.

= Meliolaceae =

Family of fungi

The Meliolaceae are a family of fungi in the order Meliolales. Mostly tropical in distribution, species in this family are biotrophic on the leaves and stems of plants. Despite this, most species do not cause extensive damage to the host plant, and are not generally considered to be of economic significance.

== Genera ==
The following genera belong to the family Melioceae, according to the 2020 study. (includes number of species per genus)

- Amazonia Theiss. (60)
- Appendiculella Höhn. (70)
- Asteridiella McAlpine (2)
- Ceratospermopsis Batista (2)
- Cryptomeliola S. Hughes & Piroz. (3)
- Endomeliola S. Hughes & Piroz. (1)
- Irenopsis F. Stevens (150)
- Meliola Fr. (1700)
- Setameliola D.R. Reynolds (17)
