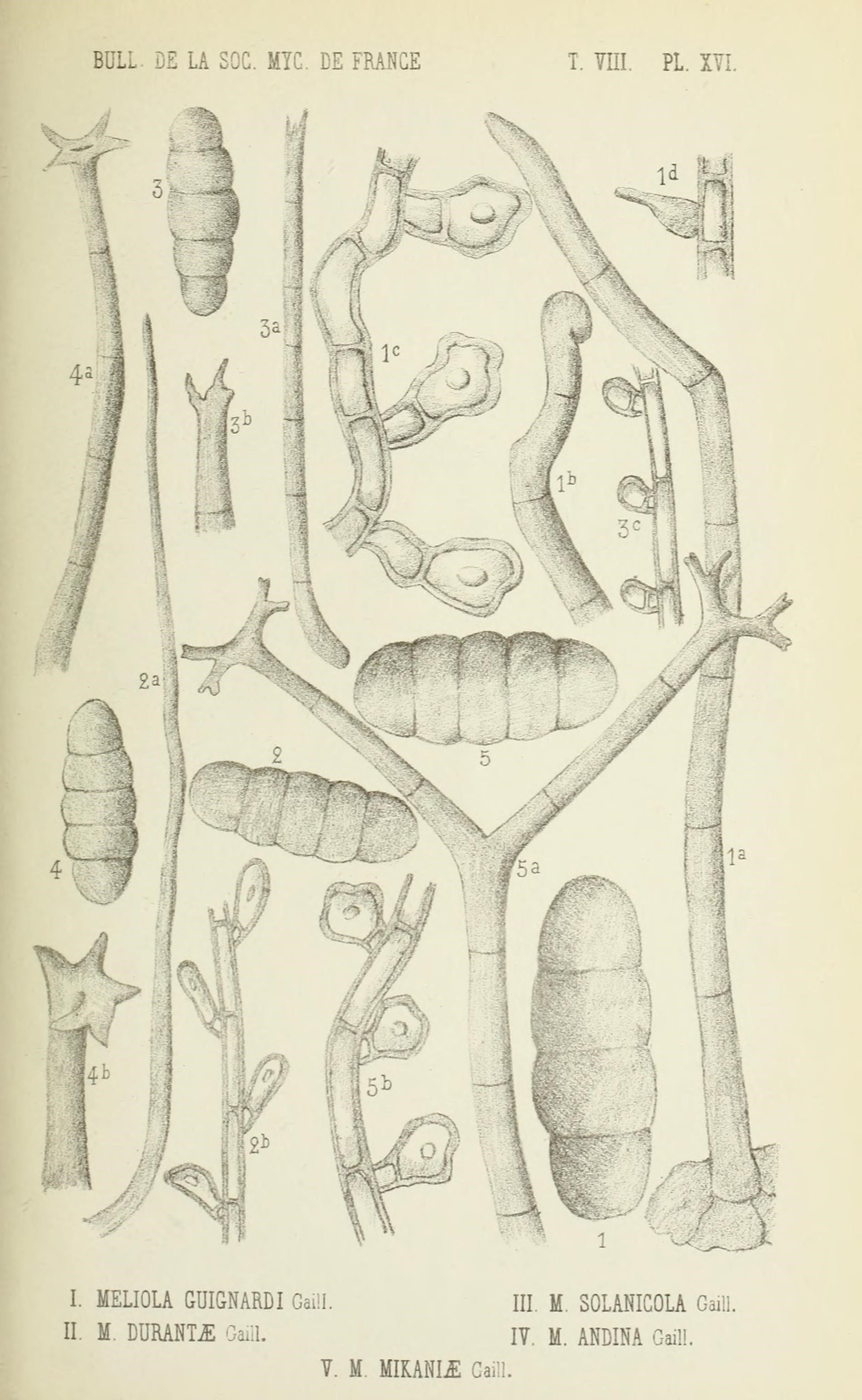
- I. Meliola guignardi Gaill. (now Irenopsis guignardii) II. Meliola durantæ Gaill. (now Meliola durantae) III. Meliola solanicola Gaill. IV. Meliola andina Gaill. V. Meliola mikaniæ Gaill. (now Meliola mikaniae)

Scientific classification
- Domain: Eukaryota
- Kingdom: Fungi
- Division: Ascomycota
- Class: Sordariomycetes
- Order: Meliolales; Gäum. ex D. Hawksw. & O.E. Erikss., 1986

Families
- Armatellaceae; Meliolaceae

= Meliolales =

Order of fungi

Meliolales is a fungal order in the class Sordariomycetes. Meliolales, also known as black mildews, are obligate parasitic ascomycetous fungi that are found in the tropics and subtropics on leaves, twigs, and sometimes fruit of vascular plants. As parasites, they are frequently parasitized by other fungi, known as hyperparasites.

== Families ==
- Armatellaceae
- Meliolaceae

== See also ==
- List of fungal orders
