= List of Meliola species =

This is a list of binomial names in the fungi genus Meliola (in the family of Meliolaceae), with just accepted species and not including synonyms.

Outline of Fungi and fungus-like taxa lists up to 1700 species (in 2020). Which are listed by Species Fungorum;

== A ==
- Meliola abdulkalamii Hosag. & Riju (2011)
- Meliola abietis Sacc. (1882)
- Meliola abraensis Petr. (1959)
- Meliola abrahamii Hosag., C.K. Biju & G. Rajkumar (2001)
- Meliola abri Hosag. & Riju (2011)
- Meliola abrupta Syd. & P. Syd. (1917)
- Meliola acaciae X.Y. Zeng, K.D. Hyde & T.C. Wen (2020)
- Meliola acaciae-confusae Sawada (1931)
- Meliola acaciarum Speg. (1922)
- Meliola acaciicola Hansf. (1963)
- Meliola acalyphicola Deighton (1968)
- Meliola acamptinga Speg. (1908)
- Meliola acanthacearum Hansf. (1946)
- Meliola acanthopanacis W. Yamam. (1941)
- Meliola aceris W. Yamam. (1940)
- Meliola achudemiae Hansf. (1954)
- Meliola achyrospermi Hansf. & Deighton (1948)
- Meliola acridocarpi Doidge (1941)
- Meliola acristae Hansf. (1957)
- Meliola acrotricha Syd. (1925)
- Meliola actephilae Hosag., C.K. Biju & T.K. Abraham (2005)
- Meliola actinodaphneicola Hosag. & T.K. Abraham (1998)
- Meliola actinodaphnes Hansf. (1948)
- Meliola acunae Schmied. (1989)
- Meliola acutiseta Syd. & P. Syd. (1913)
- Meliola adenantherae (Cif.) Hansf. (1961)
- Meliola adenanthericola Hosag., Kamar. & K.P. Babu (2001)
- Meliola adunciseta Hansf. (1963)
- Meliola aegiphilae F. Stevens (1928)
- Meliola aequatoriensis Petr. (1948)
- Meliola aethiops Sacc. (1921)
- Meliola affinis Syd. & P. Syd. (1913)
- Meliola africana Hansf. (1957)
- Meliola aganopes Hosag., Jac. Thomas & D.K. Agarwal (2010)
- Meliola agauriae Hansf. (1947)
- Meliola agavicola Mig. Rodr. & Camino (1987)
- Meliola agelaeicola Hansf. (1946)
- Meliola aglaiae Syd. & P. Syd. (1914)
- Meliola aglaiae-edulis T.K. Jana, S.N. Ghosh & A.K. Das (2005)
- Meliola aglaiicola Hansf. (1954)
- Meliola aglaina Hansf. (1955)
- Meliola agnolae-mariae Cif. (1954)
- Meliola agonandrae Speg. (1924)
- Meliola agrostistachydis Hosag. & G. Rajkumar (2005)
- Meliola ailanthi J.K. Sharma, C.N. Mohanan & Florence (1985)
- Meliola ailanthicola Hosag. & Riju (2010)
- Meliola alangii Syd. & P. Syd. (1916)
- Meliola alatae Mibey (1997)
- Meliola albiziae Hansf. & Deighton (1948)
- Meliola albiziae-granulosae B. Huguenin (1969)
- Meliola albiziae-polyanthae W.R.O. Soares & Dianese (2013)
- Meliola alchorneicola Hansf. (1954)
- Meliola alectryonis Hansf. (1953)
- Meliola alibertiae F. Stevens (1928)
- Meliola aliena Syd. & P. Syd. (1912)
- Meliola allophyli Doidge (1928)
- Meliola allophyli-concanici Hosag. (1994)
- Meliola allophyligena Hosag. (2006)
- Meliola allophyli-serrulati Hosag. & T.K. Abraham (1998)
- Meliola allophylorum Mibey (1997)
- Meliola alniphylli W. Yamam. (1940)
- Meliola alocasiae Syd. (1925)
- Meliola alstoniae Koord. (1907)
- Meliola alstoniae-comptonii B. Huguenin (1969)
- Meliola alstoniicola Hansf. (1945)
- Meliola alternipes (Speg.) Hansf. (1955)
- Meliola altingiae B. Song & Y.X. Hu (1997)
- Meliola altissimae Hosag. (1991)
- Meliola alyxiae F. Stevens (1925)
- Meliola alyxiicola B. Huguenin (1969)
- Meliola amadelpha Syd. (1925)
- Meliola amaniensis Hansf. (1946)
- Meliola amaraliae Hansf. & Deighton (1948)
- Meliola ambigua Pat. & Gaillard (1889)
- Meliola amboinensis Syd. (1922)
- Meliola amerimni (F. Stevens) Hansf. (1961)
- Meliola amomicola F. Stevens (1916)
- Meliola amoorae H.S. Yates (1918)
- Meliola amphigena F. Stevens & Tehon (1926)
- Meliola amphitricha Fr. (1828)
- Meliola amyridis (Hansf.) Minter (2006)
- Meliola anacardii Zimm. (1902)
- Meliola anacolosae Hansf. (1954)
- Meliola anceps Syd. & P. Syd. (1916)
- Meliola ancistrocladi Hosag. (1990)
- Meliola andamanica Hosag. (2014)
- Meliola andina Gaillard (1892)
- Meliola andirae Earle (1905)
- Meliola andirae-humilis W.R.O. Soares & Dianese (2013)
- Meliola andropogonis F. Stevens & A. Roldán ex W. Yamam. (1958)
- Meliola anfracta Cif. (1938)
- Meliola angiopteridis Hansf. (1954)
- Meliola angusta F. Stevens & Tehon (1926)
- Meliola angustispora F. Stevens (1928)
- Meliola anisomelis T.K. Jana, S.N. Ghosh & A.K. Das (2005)
- Meliola anisophylleae Hansf. & Deighton (1948)
- Meliola annonacearum F. Stevens (1928)
- Meliola annonae F. Stevens (1928)
- Meliola anodendri Sawada & W. Yamam. (1959)
- Meliola anodendricola Hosag. (2006)
- Meliola anthospermi Hansf. (1941)
- Meliola antioquensis Garcés (1944)
- Meliola apayaoensis H.S. Yates (1918)
- Meliola aphanamixidis Hosag. (1990)
- Meliola apodytis Van der Byl (1928)
- Meliola aporusae Hosag. & P.J. Robin (2011)
- Meliola aracearum (F. Stevens) Cif. (1954)
- Meliola araliae Mont. (1845)
- Meliola araliicola W. Yamam. (1941)
- Meliola arcuata Doidge (1917)
- Meliola ardigoosii Hosag. & T.K. Abraham (1999)
- Meliola ardisiae Syd. (1925)
- Meliola ardisiicola Hosag., G. Rajkumar & Jose (2004)
- Meliola ardisiigena Hosag., Sabeena & P.J. Robin (2011)
- Meliola argomuellerae Hansf. (1944)
- Meliola argyreiae M.S. Patil & Thite (1975)
- Meliola arippaensis Hosag. & Sabeena (2013)
- Meliola ariquemensis Bat. & Cavalc. (1965)
- Meliola aristata Toro (1927)
- Meliola aristidae Bat. & J. Silva (1953)
- Meliola aristolochiae F. Stevens & Tehon (1926)
- Meliola aristolochiae-tagalae X.Y. Zeng, K.D. Hyde & T.C. Wen (2020)
- Meliola aristolochigena Hosag. & Archana (2009)
- Meliola aristolochiicola F. Stevens (1928)
- Meliola arkevermae Hosag. & Sabeena (2012)
- Meliola arnoldii Schmied. (1989)
- Meliola arrabidaeae Hansf. (1957)
- Meliola artabotrydicola Hosag. & T.K. Abraham (1998)
- Meliola artabotrydis Hansf. (1938)
- Meliola artocarpi H.S. Yates (1917)
- Meliola arundinis Pat. (1897)
- Meliola asclepiadacearum Hansf. (1945)
- Meliola asperipoda Hansf. (1955)
- Meliola atalantiae (Pat.) W. Yamam. (1958)
- Meliola atalayae Doidge (1948)
- Meliola aterrima Syd. (1926)
- Meliola atkinsonii Hansf. (1957)
- Meliola atricapilla Starbäck (1904)
- Meliola atrovelutina Speg. (1924)
- Meliola attayarica Hosag. & T.K. Abraham (1999)
- Meliola atylosiae Hosag. (1990)
- Meliola aucoumeae J.M. Yen & Sulmont (1973)
- Meliola australis I. Hino & Katum. (1957)
- Meliola austro-americana J.L. Crane & A.G. Jones (2001)
- Meliola autumnalis Syd. & P. Syd. (1904)
- Meliola azimae Doidge (1928)

== B ==
- Meliola baccharidis Berk. & Ravenel (1876)
- Meliola bactridis Hansf. (1957)
- Meliola baileyi Hansf. (1953)
- Meliola baisseae Deighton (1958)
- Meliola bakeri Syd. & P. Syd. (1916)
- Meliola balakrishnanii L.N. Nair & V.P. Kaul (1983)
- Meliola balanitis Hansf. (1945)
- Meliola balansae Gaillard (1892)
- Meliola bambusae Pat. (1888)
- Meliola bambusicola Hansf. (1947)
- Meliola banahaensis H.S. Yates (1918)
- Meliola banarae F. Stevens (1928)
- Meliola banasuranii Hosag., C.K. Biju & T.K. Abraham (2005)
- Meliola bangalorensis Hansf. & Thirum. (1948)
- Meliola banguiensis H.S. Yates (1918)
- Meliola banksiae Hansf. (1958)
- Meliola banosensis Syd. & P. Syd. (1916)
- Meliola bantamensis Hansf. (1954)
- Meliola baphiae-nitidae Hansf. & Deighton (1948)
- Meliola baphiae-polygalaceae Hansf. & Deighton (1948)
- Meliola barleriae Srinivas. (1974)
- Meliola barringtoniae H.S. Yates (1917)
- Meliola barringtoniicola F. Stevens & Roldan ex Hansf. (1963)
- Meliola barsamae Hansf. (1937)
- Meliola bataanensis Syd. & P. Syd. (1914)
- Meliola batangasensis Hansf. (1957)
- Meliola bauhiniae H.S. Yates (1918)
- Meliola bauhiniae-phoeniceae Hosag., H. Biju & Manojk. (2004)
- Meliola bauhiniicola W. Yamam. (1941)
- Meliola beebei F. Stevens (1928)
- Meliola begoniae Hansf. (1947)
- Meliola behniae Syd. (1928)
- Meliola beilschmiediae W. Yamam. (1941)
- Meliola beilschmiediicola Hosag. (1996)
- Meliola beloperonis Viégas (1944)
- Meliola berliniae Hansf. & Deighton (1948)
- Meliola bersamae Hansf. (1937)
- Meliola besleriae Hansf. (1955)
- Meliola bhesae Hosag. (1991)
- Meliola bhimashankarensis Lonkar, Patil & Salunkhe (2018)
- Meliola bicornis G. Winter (1886)
- Meliola bidentata Cooke (1882)
- Meliola biegensis Hansf. (1957)
- Meliola bifida Cooke (1880)
- Meliola bignoniacearum F. Stevens (1928)
- Meliola biparasitica Cif. (1938)
- Meliola biserrata (Cif.) Cif. (1961)
- Meliola bisgoeppertiae (Cif.) Cif. (1961)
- Meliola bissei Schmied. (1989)
- Meliola bixae Hansf. (1955)
- Meliola blepharidis & C.R. Patil (1985)
- Meliola bodoquenensis W.R.O. Soares & Dianese (2013)
- Meliola boedijniana Hansf. (1954)
- Meliola boerlagiodendriae H.S. Yates (1918)
- Meliola bonamiae Hansf. & Deighton (1948)
- Meliola bonaoensis Cif. (1954)
- Meliola bonarii Bat. & Nascim. (1957)
- Meliola bonetii Cif. (1954)
- Meliola boninensis Speg. (1921)
- Meliola borbonicae Mibey (1997)
- Meliola borinquena Cif. (1954)
- Meliola borneensis Syd. & P. Syd. (1923)
- Meliola bosei Hosag. (1996)
- Meliola bouchardatiae Hansf. (1953)
- Meliola bougheyana S. Hughes (1952)
- Meliola brachycera Syd. (1926)
- Meliola brachyodonta Syd. (1928)
- Meliola brachypoda Syd. (1922)
- Meliola brandisiae Hansf. (1948)
- Meliola brassaiopsidis Hosag. (1996)
- Meliola brevidentata Syd. (1930)
- Meliola brevispora M.L. Farr (1987)
- Meliola brideliae F. Stevens & Roldan ex Hansf. (1963)
- Meliola brideliicola Hansf. (1946)
- Meliola brillantaisiae Hansf. & Deighton (1948)
- Meliola brisbanensis Hansf. (1953)
- Meliola brooksii Hansf. (1955)
- Meliola bruguierae Syd. (1925)
- Meliola bryae Hansf. (1957)
- Meliola buchananiae F. Stevens ex Hansf. (1957)
- Meliola buchananiicola Hosag. (1990)
- Meliola buchenaviae Bat. (1953)
- Meliola bucklandiae A.K. Kar & Maity (1970)
- Meliola bumeliae Hansf. (1957)
- Meliola bunyorensis Hansf. (1938)
- Meliola burgosensis Hansf. (1955)
- Meliola burseracearum F. Stevens (1928)
- Meliola busogensis Hansf. (1938)
- Meliola bussei Mibey (1997)
- Meliola buteae Hafiz Khan, Azmatullah & Kafi (1955)
- Meliola butyrospermi Hansf. & Deighton (1948)
- Meliola buxaduarii T.K. Jana & S.N. Ghosh (2008)
- Meliola buxi Cif. (1938)
- Meliola buxicola Doidge (1928)
- Meliola bwaniana Mibey (1997)
- Meliola byrsonimae F. Stevens (1916)
- Meliola byrsonimicola F. Stevens & Tehon (1926)
- Meliola byrsonimina F. Stevens & Tehon (1926)

== C ==
- Meliola cabellensis Syd. (1930)
- Meliola cadambae Hosag. & C.K. Biju (2003)
- Meliola cadigensis H.S. Yates (1917)
- Meliola caesalpiniae (Hansf. & Deighton) Hansf. & Deighton (1958)
- Meliola caesalpiniicola Deighton (1958)
- Meliola calami Hansf. & Deighton (1948)
- Meliola calatheae F. Stevens (1928)
- Meliola calatheicola F. Stevens (1928)
- Meliola callicarpae Syd. & P. Syd. (1912)
- Meliola callicarpicola W. Yamam. (1941)
- Meliola callosperma Speg. (1918)
- Meliola calochaeta Syd. (1925)
- Meliola calopogonii F. Stevens (1928)
- Meliola calpidiae B. Huguenin (1969)
- Meliola calycopteridis Hosag., Archana, Khaleel & Libina (2013)
- Meliola camaragibeicola Bat. & H. Maia (1956)
- Meliola camelliae (Catt.) Sacc. (1882)
- Meliola camelliicola W. Yamam. (1941)
- Meliola campanulacearum Mig. Rodr. & Camino (1987)
- Meliola campylopoda Syd. (1926)
- Meliola campylotricha Syd. (1924)
- Meliola canangae F. Stevens ex Hansf. (1957)
- Meliola canarii Syd. & P. Syd. (1914)
- Meliola canarii-albi B. Song & Y.X. Hu (1997)
- Meliola canariifolia Hosag., S.P. Mathew & D. Babu (2014)
- Meliola canavaliae Hosag. & Riju (2011)
- Meliola canellae Cif. (1933)
- Meliola canfacotensis Hansf. (1961)
- Meliola cannonicola Hosag. & C.K. Biju (2004)
- Meliola cannonii Hosag. (2005)
- Meliola cansjerae Hansf. & Thirum. (1948)
- Meliola cansjericola Hosag. (1990)
- Meliola cantareirensis Hansf. (1957)
- Meliola canthii-angustifolii Hosag. (1996)
- Meliola canthiicola Hosag., C.K. Biju & T.K. Abraham (2001)
- Meliola canthiigena Hosag., Archana & D.K. Agarwal (2007)
- Meliola capensis (Kalchbr. & Cooke) Theiss. (1912)
- Meliola capilligera Cif. (1933)
- Meliola capillipedii T.K. Jana, S.N. Ghosh & A.K. Das (2005)
- Meliola capitati Mibey (1997)
- Meliola capparicola Hosag. (1996)
- Meliola capparis Hansf. (1946)
- Meliola capsicicola F. Stevens (1916)
- Meliola caput-medusae Cif. (1933)
- Meliola carapae Hansf. & Deighton (1948)
- Meliola carbonacea Cif. (1938)
- Meliola cardiospermi Hansf. & F. Stevens (1937)
- Meliola careyae (F. Stevens) Hosag. (2003)
- Meliola cariappae Hosag., Thimm. & Archana (2013)
- Meliola caricis Hansf. (1958)
- Meliola carissae Doidge (1922)
- Meliola carludovicae Hansf. (1955)
- Meliola carolinensis A.H. Sm. & Hesler (1940)
- Meliola carpolobiae Hansf. (1946)
- Meliola carpolobiicola Hansf. & Deighton (1948)
- Meliola carvalhoi Deighton (1951)
- Meliola caryotae Srinivas. (1974)
- Meliola caseariae Petr. & Cif. (1930)
- Meliola caseariae-arboreae Hansf. (1957)
- Meliola caseariae-guianensis Hansf. (1955)
- Meliola caseariicola Hansf. (1947)
- Meliola cassiae-ferrugineae Pinho & O.L. Pereira (2012)
- Meliola cassiae-fistulae Hosag. & Manojk. (2004)
- Meliola cassiifolii Bat. (1960)
- Meliola cassythae Bat., Cavalc. & V.D. Silveira (1965)
- Meliola castaneifoliae Mibey (1997)
- Meliola castanha Theiss. (1914)
- Meliola castanopsidicola J.L. Crane & A.G. Jones (2001)
- Meliola castanopsidis Hansf. (1948)
- Meliola castanopsina W. Yamam. (1941)
- Meliola castelae J.A. Stev. (1969)
- Meliola castlerockensis Srinivas. (1974)
- Meliola catherinensis Hansf. (1955)
- Meliola catubigensis H.S. Yates (1917)
- Meliola cauveriana Hosag., Divya & Thimm. (2013)
- Meliola cavitensis H.S. Yates (1918)
- Meliola caxangaensis Bat. (1963)
- Meliola caymanensis Ellis & Everh. (1900)
- Meliola cayratiae Hosag., Jac. Thomas & D.K. Agarwal (2010)
- Meliola celastracearum Hosag. & B.R. Dayal (1996)
- Meliola celastrigena Hosag. (2013)
- Meliola celtidicola H.S. Yates (1918)
- Meliola celtidis H.S. Yates (1918)
- Meliola celtidum Speg. (1924)
- Meliola centellae Pinho & O.L. Pereira (2012)
- Meliola ceratopetali Hansf. (1953)
- Meliola ceriopis Hansf. (1957)
- Meliola ceropegia Hosag. & V.S. Ramach. (1991)
- Meliola cestri Tehon (1919)
- Meliola cestricola F. Stevens (1928)
- Meliola cestri-macrophylli Hansf. (1957)
- Meliola chaetachmes Hansf. (1938)
- Meliola chaetochloae F. Stevens (1928)
- Meliola chagres F. Stevens (1928)
- Meliola chamaecristae Earle (1905)
- Meliola chamissoae Hansf. (1955)
- Meliola champereiae Syd. & P. Syd. (1914)
- Meliola chandleri Hansf. (1937)
- Meliola chandolensis C.R. Patil ex Hosag. (1996)
- Meliola chandrasekharanii Hosag. (1990)
- Meliola chasaliae Mibey (1997)
- Meliola chassaliicola Hosag. (2004)
- Meliola chelonanthi Hansf. (1957)
- Meliola chenniana Hosag. & Goos (1998)
- Meliola chilensis Speg. (1921)
- Meliola chilocarpi Hosag. & T.K. Abraham (1998)
- Meliola chloristylidis Doidge (1927)
- Meliola chlorophorae Hansf. (1946)
- Meliola cholakadensis Hosag., C.K. Biju, T.K. Abraham & J.L. Crane (2000)
- Meliola chorizandrae B. Huguenin (1969)
- Meliola chorleyi Hansf. (1938)
- Meliola chrysobalanacearum M.L. Farr (1987)
- Meliola chukrasiae Hosag. (1996)
- Meliola chukrasiicola Hosag. (2014)
- Meliola cibaoensis Hansf. (1955)
- Meliola ciferrii Hansf. (1961)
- Meliola cinnamodendri J.A. Stev. (1943)
- Meliola cinnamomi Hosag. & T.K. Abraham (1999)
- Meliola cipadessae Hosag., Jac. Thomas & D.K. Agarwal (2010)
- Meliola cissampeli Hansf. & F. Stevens (1937)
- Meliola cissampelicola Hansf. & Thirum. (1948)
- Meliola cissi Hansf. (1937)
- Meliola cissi-antarcticae Hansf. (1953)
- Meliola cissi-caesiae Hansf. & Deighton (1948)
- Meliola cissi-productae Deighton (1951)
- Meliola cissi-repandae Hansf. (1954)
- Meliola cissi-rhombifoliae Hansf. (1957)
- Meliola citharexyli (Hansf.) Cif. (1961)
- Meliola citricola Syd. & P. Syd. (1917)
- Meliola citri-maximae X.Y. Zeng, K.D. Hyde & T.C. Wen (2016)
- Meliola citronellae Hansf. (1953)
- Meliola cladacantha Cif. (1954)
- Meliola cladophaga Syd. (1926)
- Meliola cladophila Syd. (1924)
- Meliola clausenae Hosag. (1990)
- Meliola clausenigena Hosag. & Riju (2011)
- Meliola clavatispora Speg. (1889)
- Meliola clavulata G. Winter (1886)
- Meliola cleistopholidis Hansf. (1945)
- Meliola clerodendri Hansf. (1937)
- Meliola clerodendricola Henn. (1898)
- Meliola clerodendri-infortunati X.Y. Zeng, K.D. Hyde & T.C. Wen (2017)
- Meliola clitoriae Hosag. & Goos (1990)
- Meliola clutiae Van der Byl (1926)
- Meliola cnestidis Doidge (1928)
- Meliola coccolobae-nodosae Hansf. (1955)
- Meliola coccolobis F. Stevens & Tehon (1926)
- Meliola cochlospermifolii Bat. (1960)
- Meliola coffeae Hansf. (1937)
- Meliola cogniauxiae Hansf. (1957)
- Meliola coilicosa L.N. Nair & V.P. Kaul (1983)
- Meliola colae-simiarum Deighton (1958)
- Meliola colladoi Syd. & P. Syd. (1920)
- Meliola colletiae Hansf. (1961)
- Meliola colliguajae Speg. (1912)
- Meliola colombiensis Hansf. (1955)
- Meliola colubrinicola Hosag. & Sabeena (2012)
- Meliola columneae F. Stevens (1928)
- Meliola combinans Cif. (1957)
- Meliola commixta Theiss. (1919)
- Meliola comptonellae B. Huguenin (1969)
- Meliola condaliae J.A. Stev. (1946)
- Meliola conferta Doidge (1917)
- Meliola congoensis (Beeli) Hansf. (1961)
- Meliola conica F. Stevens (1928)
- Meliola conigera F. Stevens & Tehon (1926)
- Meliola connari H.S. Yates (1917)
- Meliola connaricola Hansf. (1955)
- Meliola consocia Cif. (1954)
- Meliola constipata (Speg.) Speg. (1924)
- Meliola contigua P. Karst. & Roum. (1890)
- Meliola contorta F. Stevens (1916)
- Meliola convallata Petr. (1937)
- Meliola cookeana Speg. (1881)
- Meliola coorgiana Hosag., Divya & Thimm. (2013)
- Meliola copaiferae Hansf. & Deighton (1948)
- Meliola corallina Mont. (1850)
- Meliola corazoyensis Hansf. (1961)
- Meliola cordiae-rufescentis Hansf. & Bat. (1957)
- Meliola cordiicola Hansf. (1957)
- Meliola coreopsidis Thite & U.K. Kulk. (1978)
- Meliola couthoviae B. Huguenin (1969)
- Meliola cranei Hosag. & Goos (1998)
- Meliola craterispermi Mibey & P.F. Cannon (1999)
- Meliola crenata G. Winter (1892)
- Meliola crenatissima Syd. & P. Syd. (1916)
- Meliola crenatofurcata Syd. & P. Syd. (1916)
- Meliola crescentiae F. Stevens (1928)
- Meliola cristata F. Stevens (1928)
- Meliola crotonicola F. Stevens (1928)
- Meliola crotonis-macrostachydis Hansf. (1963)
- Meliola crotonis-malabarici Hosag. (2006)
- Meliola crotonis-nigritani Deighton (1958)
- Meliola crucifera Starbäck (1905)
- Meliola cryptica S. Hughes (1953)
- Meliola cryptocaryae Doidge (1920)
- Meliola cryptocaryicola Hosag. & Raghu (1993)
- Meliola cubitella (F. Stevens & Tehon) Cif. ex Hansf. (1961)
- Meliola cucurbitacearum F. Stevens (1916)
- Meliola culebrensis Hansf. (1957)
- Meliola cumbrensis Hansf. (1957)
- Meliola cunoniae Hansf. (1955)
- Meliola cupaniae-majoris Bat. (1953)
- Meliola cupaniicola Bat. (1960)
- Meliola curviseta Racib. (1900)
- Meliola cuscutae Hansf. (1958)
- Meliola cyathocalycis T.K. Jana, S.N. Ghosh & A.K. Das (2005)
- Meliola cyathodis Hansf. (1946)
- Meliola cybianthis Toro (1934)
- Meliola cyclantherae Syd. (1930)
- Meliola cycleae Hosag. (1990)
- Meliola cyclobalanopsina W. Yamam. (1941)
- Meliola cydistae F. Stevens (1928)
- Meliola cylindrophora Rehm (1913)
- Meliola cylindropoda Doidge (1920)
- Meliola cymbopogonis J.N. Kapoor (1967)
- Meliola cynanchi Hosag., D.K. Agarwal, H. Biju & Archana (2006)
- Meliola cyperacearum Hosag., Dhivah. & Riju (2011)
- Meliola cyrillacearum Schmied. (1989)
- Meliola cyrtochaeta Syd. (1928)

== D ==
- Meliola dactylopoda Syd. (1928)
- Meliola dalbergiae Hansf. (1958)
- Meliola dalechampiae (F. Stevens) Cif. (1954)
- Meliola dallasica Petr. (1954)
- Meliola danertii Schmied. (1989)
- Meliola danielliae Hansf. & Deighton (1948)
- Meliola daphniphyllicola B. Song & T.H. Li (2002)
- Meliola darwiniana Mibey (1997)
- Meliola dasiana Mibey (1 997)
- Meliola daviesii Hansf. (1946)
- Meliola decidua Speg. (1889)
- Meliola decora Syd. (1939)
- Meliola deformis Deighton (1958)
- Meliola dehradunensis Gawande & D.K. Agarwal (2004)
- Meliola deinbolliae Hansf. (1937)
- Meliola delae Schmied. (1989)
- Meliola delicatula Speg. (1888)
- Meliola dendropemonis Petr. & Cif. (1930)
- Meliola dendrophthoicola Hosag. & T.K. Abraham (1999)
- Meliola dendroseta Mibey & P.F. Cannon (1999)
- Meliola dendrotrophicola H. Hu & J.C. Yang (1989)
- Meliola densa Cooke (1884)
- Meliola denticulata G. Winter (1892)
- Meliola dentifera Syd. & P. Syd. (1916)
- Meliola depressula Syd. & P. Syd. (1917)
- Meliola derridis H.S. Yates (1918)
- Meliola desmodii P. Karst. & Roum. (1890)
- Meliola desmodiicola Beeli (1920)
- Meliola desmodii-heterocarpi Hosag. & Sabeena (2013)
- Meliola desmodii-laxiflori Deighton (1958)
- Meliola desmodii-motorii Hosag. & Manojk. (2005)
- Meliola desmodii-pulchelli Hosag., T.K. Abraham & C.K. Biju (1999)
- Meliola desmodii-triangularis Hosag. & Manojk. (2004)
- Meliola desmodii-triquetri Hosag. & Manojk. (2004)
- Meliola desmodii-velutini Hosag. & Manojk. (2004)
- Meliola desmonci Hansf. (1957)
- Meliola devikulamensis Hosag., H. Biju & Manojk. (2005)
- Meliola dichapetali Hansf. & Thirum. (1948)
- Meliola dichotoma Berk. & M.A. Curtis (1860)
- Meliola dicranochaeta Syd. (1926)
- Meliola didymopanacis Henn. (1895)
- Meliola dieffenbachiae F. Stevens (1916)
- Meliola digoana Mibey (1997)
- Meliola dilcheri R.K. Saxena (2022)
- Meliola dimidiatae Hosag. (1990)
- Meliola dimocarpi Hosag. & T.K. Abraham (1998)
- Meliola dimorphochaeta M.S. Patil & Maham. (1999)
- Meliola dioicae Bhise & C.R. Patil (2014)
- Meliola dioscoreacearum Hosag. & Jac. Thomas (2009)
- Meliola dioscoreae Hansf. & Deighton (1948)
- Meliola dioscoreicola Hansf. & Deighton (1948)
- Meliola dioscoreigena Hosag. & Jac. Thomas (2009)
- Meliola diospyri Syd. & P. Syd. (1911)
- Meliola diospyri-buxifoliae Hosag., Sabeena & Riju (2011)
- Meliola diospyricola Hansf. (1953)
- Meliola diospyri-pentamerae Hansf. (1953)
- Meliola dipholidis F. Stevens (1916)
- Meliola diphysae F. Stevens (1928)
- Meliola diplochaeta Syd. & P. Syd. (1912)
- Meliola dipterygicola Bat. & H. Maia (1966)
- Meliola disciseta Roger (1936)
- Meliola discocalycis F. Stevens ex Hansf. (1957)
- Meliola dissotidis Hansf. & Deighton (1948)
- Meliola distictidis Hansf. (1948)
- Meliola dognyensis B. Huguenin (1969)
- Meliola doidgeae Syd. (1928)
- Meliola dolabrata Syd. & P. Syd. (1921)
- Meliola dolichi Hosag. (2006)
- Meliola domingensis Cif. (1954)
- Meliola dorsteniae Hosag. & T.K. Abraham (1998)
- Meliola doryphorae Hansf. (1956)
- Meliola dracaenae F. Stevens (1925)
- Meliola dracaenae-terniflorae Hosag. (1996)
- Meliola dracaenicola Har. & Pat. (1908)
- Meliola drepanochaeta Syd. (1926)
- Meliola drypeticola Hosag. (1990)
- Meliola duabangae Y.X. Hu (1993)
- Meliola duggenae F. Stevens (1928)
- Meliola dummeri Hansf. (1938)
- Meliola durantae Gaillard (1892)
- Meliola durionis Hansf. (1957)
- Meliola dysoxyli Hansf. (1953)
- Meliola dysoxyli-andamanensis Sabeena, H. Biju, Jac. Thomas, C.K. Biju & S.P. Mathew (2017)
- Meliola dysoxylicola Hansf. (1953)
- Meliola dysoxyligena Hosag. & Riju (2011)
- Meliola dysoxyli-malabarici Hosag. & Kamar. (2002)
- Meliola dysoxylina Hansf. (1961)
- Meliola dysoxyli-nitidi B. Huguenin (1969)

== E ==
- Meliola earleana Cif. (1954)
- Meliola earlii F. Stevens (1916)
- Meliola ebeni Hosag. & Archana (2010)
- Meliola echitis Hansf. (1957)
- Meliola ecuadorensis F. Stevens (1928)
- Meliola edanoana F. Stevens ex Hansf. (1957)
- Meliola effusa Gaillard (1892)
- Meliola ehretiae Hansf. (1955)
- Meliola ehretiicola Hosag. (1996)
- Meliola ekebergiae Hansf. (1937)
- Meliola ekmaniana Cif. (1954)
- Meliola elaeagni Hansf. & Thirum. (1948)
- Meliola elaeidis F. Stevens (1928)
- Meliola elaeocarpi H.S. Yates (1917)
- Meliola elaeocarpicola Lini K. Mathew (2020)
- Meliola elattostachydis Petr. (1959)
- Meliola elephantopodis Hansf. (1958)
- Meliola ellertoniae Hosag. & T.K. Abraham (1998)
- Meliola ellipanthi Mibey (1997)
- Meliola ellisii Roum. (1880)
- Meliola elmeri Syd. & P. Syd. (1912)
- Meliola elodea Syd. (1928)
- Meliola emespatilii Hosag., D.K. Agarwal & Archana (2006)
- Meliola emmenospermatis Hansf. (1953)
- Meliola englerinae Deighton (1958)
- Meliola entadae Hansf. (1949)
- Meliola entadicola Deighton (1958)
- Meliola entebbeensis Hansf. (1944)
- Meliola epithematis F. Stevens & Roldan ex Hansf. (1963)
- Meliola epiviscum Cif. (1954)
- Meliola erioglossi F. Stevens ex Hansf. (1957)
- Meliola eriolaenicola B. Song & Y.H. Shen (2002)
- Meliola eriophora Speg. (1888)
- Meliola eriosemae W.R.O. Soares & Dianese (2013)
- Meliola erithalidis (Cif.) Hansf. (1949)
- Meliola erumeliensis Hosag., Archana, Rajendrapr. & Nazarudeen (2009)
- Meliola ervatamiae Hosag. (1988)
- Meliola erycibes Hansf. (1954)
- Meliola erycibes-paniculatae Hosag. (1990)
- Meliola erycibicola Sawada & W. Yamam. (1959)
- Meliola erythrinae Syd. & P. Syd. (1917)
- Meliola erythrinae-micropterycis Hansf. (1961)
- Meliola erythrinicola Deighton (1958)
- Meliola erythropali Hosag. (1990)
- Meliola erythrophlei Hansf. & Deighton (1948)
- Meliola erythrophloeicola Mibey (1997)
- Meliola erythroxylicola Hosag. & G. Rajkumar (2004)
- Meliola erythroxylifoliae Bat. & A.F. Vital (1953)
- Meliola eucalypti F. Stevens & Roldan ex Hansf. (1963)
- Meliola euchrestae W. Yamam. (1941)
- Meliola eucleae Hansf. (1941)
- Meliola eugeniae Syd. (1922)
- Meliola eugeniae-calophylloidis Hansf. & Deighton (1957)
- Meliola eugeniae-jamboloidis Hansf. (1954)
- Meliola eugeniae-monticolae Hansf. (1957)
- Meliola eugeniae-stocksii Hosag. (1996)
- Meliola eugeniicola F. Stevens (1928)
- Meliola euodiae Pat. (1888)
- Meliola euodiicola Hansf. (1954)
- Meliola euonymi F. Stevens ex Hansf. (1957)
- Meliola euonymicola Hosag. (1996)
- Meliola euopla Syd. (1928)
- Meliola eupatorii Schmied. (1989)
- Meliola euphorbiae F. Stevens & Tehon (1926)
- Meliola evanida Gaillard (1892)
- Meliola evansii Doidge (1920)
- Meliola eveae F. Stevens (1928)
- Meliola exaci Hosag. (1996)
- Meliola exacigena Hosag., Archana & Kandavel (2007)
- Meliola excoecariae Doidge (1920)
- Meliola excoecariicola F. Stevens ex Hansf. (1957)
- Meliola exocarpi H.S. Yates (1918)

== F ==
- Meliola fabri B. Song, T.H. Li & Y.H. Shen (2003)
- Meliola fagacearum B. Song & Goos (2002)
- Meliola fagarae Hansf. (1941)
- Meliola fagarae-martinicensis Hansf. (1949)
- Meliola fagarae-nitidae Hansf. (1961)
- Meliola fagraeae Syd. & P. Syd. (1914)
- Meliola fahrenheitiae Hosag. & T.K. Abraham (1998)
- Meliola falcata Syd. & P. Syd. (1912)
- Meliola falcatiseta Speg. (1909)
- Meliola fasciculiseta Cif. (1938)
- Meliola fatsiae Katum. & Y. Harada (1979)
- Meliola feretiae Hansf. (1957)
- Meliola ferrugineae Mibey (1997)
- Meliola fici H.S. Yates (1918)
- Meliola ficicola Hansf. & Thirum. (1948)
- Meliola ficigena Hosag. & Sabeena (2013)
- Meliola fici-globosae Hansf. (1954)
- Meliola filicii Hosag. (1991)
- Meliola filiciicola Hosag., Udaiyan & Ponnusamy (1996)
- Meliola flacourtiacearum Hansf. (1947)
- Meliola flemingiae Bagool & H. Biju (2004)
- Meliola flemingiicola Hosag., P.A. Jose & H. Biju (2005)
- Meliola floridensis Hansf. (1957)
- Meliola forbesii Gaillard (1892)
- Meliola formosa Welw. & Curr. (1868)
- Meliola formosensis W. Yamam. (1941)
- Meliola forsteroniae (F. Stevens) Hansf. (1949)
- Meliola fragrans Mibey & P.F. Cannon (1999)
- Meliola francevilleana Gaillard (1892)
- Meliola franciscana Hansf. (1949)
- Meliola fraserae Hansf. (1953)
- Meliola fructicola Hansf. (1957)
- Meliola fructicosae Mibey (1997)
- Meliola frutescentis Hosag., T.K. Abraham & J.L. Crane (1999)
- Meliola funerea McAlpine (1896)
- Meliola funtumiae Beeli (1920)
- Meliola furcata Lév. (1846)
- Meliola furcillata Doidge (1917)
- Meliola fuscidula Gaillard (1892)

== G ==
- Meliola gaillardiana F. Stevens (1916)
- Meliola galeariae Hansf. (1954)
- Meliola galipeae Syd. & P. Syd. (1916)
- Meliola galopinae Hansf. (1957)
- Meliola gamblei Hosag. (1991)
- Meliola gamsii Hosag. & Shiburaj (2002)
- Meliola ganglifera Kalchbr. (1880)
- Meliola ganophyni F. Stevens & Roldan ex Hansf. (1963)
- Meliola garciniae H.S. Yates (1918)
- Meliola garciniicola G.Z. Jiang (1987)
- Meliola garciniigena Hosag. & Sabeena (2013)
- Meliola gardneriae Hansf. & Thirum. (1948)
- Meliola garhwalensis S.L. Srivast. & Topal (1981)
- Meliola garryae Hansf. (1955)
- Meliola garugae F. Stevens & Roldan ex Hansf. (1963)
- Meliola geissaspidis Hosag. & Manojk. (2005)
- Meliola gemellipoda Doidge (1922)
- Meliola geniculata Syd., P. Syd. & E.J. Butler (1911)
- Meliola gersoppaensis Hosag., C.M. Pillai & Raghu (1996)
- Meliola gesneriae F. Stevens (1916)
- Meliola ghesquierei Hansf. (1957)
- Meliola glanduliferae Hosag., C.K. Biju & T.K. Abraham (2005)
- Meliola glaziovii Hansf. (1957)
- Meliola gleditsiae Speg. (1912)
- Meliola gliricidiae Syd. & P. Syd. (1914)
- Meliola gliricidiicola Hosag. & D.K. Agarwal (2003)
- Meliola glochidii F. Stevens & Roldan ex Hansf. (1963)
- Meliola glochidiicola W. Yamam. (1941)
- Meliola glochidiifolia Hosag. (2013)
- Meliola glutae Hosag. & T.K. Abraham (1997)
- Meliola gluticola Hosag. & Sabeena (2011)
- Meliola glycosmidis J.N. Kapoor (1967)
- Meliola gnathonella F. Stevens & Tehon (1926)
- Meliola gneti Hansf. (1954)
- Meliola gneticola Y.X. Hu (1992)
- Meliola goianensis Bat. & H. Maia (1965)
- Meliola golaensis Deighton (1958)
- Meliola gomphandrae Hosag. & T.K. Abraham (1999)
- Meliola goniothalamigena Hosag. & Thimm. (2013)
- Meliola gonzalaguniae (Cif.) Cif. (1961)
- Meliola gooseana Hosag. & T.K. Abraham (1998)
- Meliola goosii Hosag. (1991)
- Meliola gordoniae Hosag. (1996)
- Meliola gorongosensis Iturr., Raudabaugh & A.N. Mill. (2019)
- Meliola gouaniae Hansf. (1945)
- Meliola gouaniicola Hosag. & P.J. Robin (2011)
- Meliola gouldiae Hansf. (1958)
- Meliola gregoriana F. Stevens (1925)
- Meliola grevilleae Hansf. (1958)
- Meliola grevilleae-gillivrayi B. Huguenin (1969)
- Meliola grewiae Hansf. (1958)
- Meliola grewiicola Hansf. (1958)
- Meliola groteana Syd. & P. Syd. (1913)
- Meliola guamensis Syd. & P. Syd. (1921)
- Meliola guaranitica Speg. (1884)
- Meliola guareae Speg. (1912)
- Meliola guareella Hansf. (1957)
- Meliola guareicola F. Stevens (1916)
- Meliola guareina Hansf. (1957)
- Meliola guatteriae Mig. Rodr. (1999)
- Meliola guettardae (Cif.) Cif. (1961)
- Meliola guioae-semiglaucae Hansf. (1953)
- Meliola gymnanthicola F. Stevens (1916)
- Meliola gymnemae T.K. Jana, S.N. Ghosh & A.K. Das (2005)
- Meliola gymnoloniae Toro (1934)

== H ==
- Meliola hainanensis Y.X. Hu (1989)
- Meliola hamata Syd. & P. Syd. (1914)
- Meliola hancorniae J.L. Bezerra & T.T. Barros (1970)
- Meliola hannoae Deighton (1958)
- Meliola haploa Cif. (1954)
- Meliola hariotii Speg. (1891)
- Meliola harpulliicola Hosag. & Sabeena (2013)
- Meliola harrietensis Hosag. (2014)
- Meliola harrisoniae Hansf. (1938)
- Meliola hawaiiensis F. Stevens (1925)
- Meliola hederae W. Yamam. (1941)
- Meliola heliciae W. Yamam. (1941)
- Meliola heliciicola Hansf. (1958)
- Meliola heliconiae F. Stevens (1928)
- Meliola helleri Earle (1905)
- Meliola hemidesmi Kamal & B.K. Gupta (1987)
- Meliola hemidesmicola Hosag. (1996)
- Meliola hendeloti Gaillard (1892)
- Meliola hendrickxiana Hansf. (1947)
- Meliola hendrickxii Hansf. (1946)
- Meliola henryi Hosag. (1996)
- Meliola hercules Höhn. (1909)
- Meliola herteri Hansf. (1955)
- Meliola hessii F. Stevens (1916)
- Meliola heterocephala Syd. & P. Syd. (1916)
- Meliola heterodonta Syd. & P. Syd. (1916)
- Meliola heteromeles (Cooke & Harkn.) Berl. & Voglino (1886)
- Meliola heteroseta Höhn. (1909)
- Meliola heterotricha Syd. & P. Syd. (1913)
- Meliola hexaseptata Bat. & R. Garnier (1965)
- Meliola heyneae Hansf. & Thirum. (1948)
- Meliola hibisci G. Arnaud (1918)
- Meliola himalayensis J.N. Kapoor (1967)
- Meliola hippocrateae Doidge (1948)
- Meliola hippocrateicola Hansf. & Deighton (1948)
- Meliola hippomaneae F. Stevens (1928)
- Meliola hiratsukana Katum. (1991)
- Meliola hirsuta Hansf. & Deighton (1948)
- Meliola hirtellae Mibey (1997)
- Meliola hispida F. Stevens (1928)
- Meliola hoehneliana Hansf. (1961)
- Meliola hoffmannseggiana Hansf. (1961)
- Meliola holarrhenae Hansf. & Thirum. (1948)
- Meliola holarrhenae-pubescens T.K. Jana, S.N. Ghosh & A.K. Das (2005)
- Meliola holarrhenicola Deighton (1958)
- Meliola holigarnae F. Stevens (1928)
- Meliola holocalicis Speg. (1924)
- Meliola homalanthi Boedijn (1940)
- Meliola homalii Hansf. (1945)
- Meliola homaliicola Deighton (1958)
- Meliola homalii-dolichophylli Hansf. & Deighton (1948)
- Meliola homonoiae Hosag. & Sabeena (2011)
- Meliola hookeri Mibey (1997)
- Meliola hopeae H.S. Yates (1918)
- Meliola horrida Ellis & Everh. (1893)
- Meliola hosagoudarii B. Song (2003)
- Meliola hoyae Sacc. (1919)
- Meliola hudsoniana A.H. Sm. (1941)
- Meliola hughesiana Hansf. (1957)
- Meliola hugoniae Hansf. & Deighton (1948)
- Meliola hui B. Song, Goos & T.H. Li (2002)
- Meliola hunteriae Hosag. (1990)
- Meliola hurae Syd. (1930)
- Meliola hydei Hosag., C.K. Biju & T.K. Abraham (2005)
- Meliola hydnocarpi Hansf. (1957)
- Meliola hylodendri J.M. Yen & Sulmont (1973)
- Meliola hymenocardiae Hansf. & Deighton (1948)
- Meliola hypodoria Cif. (1954)
- Meliola hypoestes Hansf. (1947)
- Meliola hypselodelphyos S. Hughes (1952)
- Meliola hyptidis Syd. & P. Syd. (1910)
- Meliola hystricis A.K. Kar & Maity (1970)

== I ==
- Meliola icacinacearum Mibey (1998)
- Meliola ichnocarpi F. Stevens & Roldan (1935)
- Meliola ichnocarpi Hansf. & Thirum. (1948)
- Meliola ichnocarpi-volubili Hansf. (1963)
- Meliola ilicicola W. Yamam. (1940)
- Meliola ilicis-malabaricae Hosag. & Raghu (1993)
- Meliola illicii (Cif.) Hansf. (1955)
- Meliola illigerae F. Stevens & Roldan ex Hansf. (1963)
- Meliola illigericola Y.X. Hu & B. Song (1993)
- Meliola impatientis Doidge (1941)
- Meliola imperatae Syd. & P. Syd. (1917)
- Meliola imperspicua Deighton (1958)
- Meliola incompta Syd. & P. Syd. (1920)
- Meliola inconspicua Hansf. (1957)
- Meliola indica Syd. & P. Syd. (1911)
- Meliola indigofera Syd. (1928)
- Meliola inocarpi F. Stevens (1928)
- Meliola insignis Gaillard (1892)
- Meliola integrifolii C.R. Patil ex Hosag. (1996)
- Meliola integripoda Hosag., T.K. Abraham & J.L. Crane (1998)
- Meliola integriseta (Speg.) Speg. (1924)
- Meliola intermedia Gaillard (1892)
- Meliola interrupta Hansf. & Deighton (1948)
- Meliola intricata Syd. & P. Syd. (1913)
- Meliola invisiae Hosag. & H. Biju (2001)
- Meliola ipomoeae Earle (1901)
- Meliola ipomoeicola Beeli (1920)
- Meliola irosinensis Syd. (1925)
- Meliola irradians Gaillard (1892)
- Meliola irvingae Hansf. (1947)
- Meliola irvingiae Hansf. (1947)
- Meliola isochaeta Cif. (1938)
- Meliola isothea Syd. (1926)
- Meliola italica (Sacc.) F. Stevens (1928)
- Meliola ixorae H.S. Yates (1917)
- Meliola ixorae-coccineae Hosag. & C.M. Pillai (1994)

== J ==
- Meliola jacaratiae Bat. & J.L. Bezerra (1965)
- Meliola jahnii Toro (1934)
- Meliola jamaicensis Hansf. (1955)
- Meliola janeirensis Hansf. (1949)
- Meliola jasmini Hansf. & F. Stevens (1937)
- Meliola jasminicola Henn. (1895)
- Meliola jasminigena Hosag. (2013)
- Meliola jasmini-sambac X.Y. Zeng, K.D. Hyde & T.C. Wen (2020)
- Meliola jatrophae F. Stevens (1916)
- Meliola javanica Cif. (1951)
- Meliola jayachandranii Hosag. (1988)
- Meliola johnstonii Hansf. (1957)
- Meliola juddiana F. Stevens (1925)
- Meliola juruana Henn. (1904)
- Meliola justiciae Hansf. (1938)
- Meliola juttingii Hansf. (1954)

== K ==
- Meliola kadsurae W. Yamam. (1941)
- Meliola kagonoki I. Hino & Katum. (1963)
- Meliola kakachiana Hosag. (1996)
- Meliola kakamegensis Mibey & P.F. Cannon (1999)
- Meliola kamettiae Hosag. & Riju (2010)
- Meliola kampalensis Hansf. (1937)
- Meliola kanniyakumariana Hosag. (1996)
- Meliola kannurensis Hosag., Archana, Khaleel & Soumya (2011)
- Meliola kansireiensis W. Yamam. (1941)
- Meliola kapoorii Hosag. & Raghu (1996)
- Meliola karamojensis Hansf. (1947)
- Meliola karnatakensis Hosag., C.M. Pillai & Raghu (1996)
- Meliola kartaboensis F. Stevens (1928)
- Meliola kauaiensis F. Stevens (1925)
- Meliola kaveriappae Hosag., C.M. Pillai & Raghu (1996)
- Meliola kawakamii W. Yamam. (1941)
- Meliola kawandensis Hansf. (1957)
- Meliola keniensis Mibey (1997)
- Meliola kerichoensis Mibey (1998)
- Meliola kerniana Cif. (1938)
- Meliola kernii Hansf. (1963)
- Meliola khasiensis (Hansf.) Hansf. (1961)
- Meliola khayae Hansf. (1938)
- Meliola kibirae Hansf. & F. Stevens (1937)
- Meliola kigeliae Hansf. (1955)
- Meliola kingiodendri Hosag., B.R. Dayal & Goos (1993)
- Meliola kiraiensis W. Yamam. (1941)
- Meliola kisantuensis Hansf. (1957)
- Meliola kisubiensis Hansf. (1947)
- Meliola knemae Hosag. & P.J. Robin (2011)
- Meliola knemicola Hansf. (1954)
- Meliola knowltoniae Doidge (1924)
- Meliola knoxiae Petr. (1959)
- Meliola knoxiicola Hosag., C.K. Biju & T.K. Abraham (2005)
- Meliola knysnae Doidge (1948)
- Meliola koae F. Stevens (1925)
- Meliola kodaguensis Hosag., Divya & Thimm. (2013)
- Meliola kodaihoensis W. Yamam. (1941)
- Meliola koelreuteriae Hansf. (1948)
- Meliola koniaensis Hansf. & Deighton (1948)
- Meliola koriensis Deighton (1958)
- Meliola kreiseliana Schmied. (1989)
- Meliola krugiodendri Cif. (1938)
- Meliola kukkeensis Hosag., Archana & D.K. Agarwal (2007)
- Meliola kulathupuzhaensis Hosag. & J.P. Jacob (2006)
- Meliola kuprensis Deighton (1958)
- Meliola kusanoi Henn. (1900)
- Meliola kweichowensis Hansf. (1948)
- Meliola kydia Sacc. (1921)
- Meliola kydiae-calycinae Hansf. & Thirum. (1948)

== L ==
- Meliola laevigata Syd. & P. Syd. (1912)
- Meliola laevipoda Speg. (1891)
- Meliola lagunensis Hansf. (1963)
- Meliola lanceolatosetosa Syd. & P. Syd. (1914)
- Meliola landolphiae Hansf. (1937)
- Meliola landolphiae-floridae Hansf. (1938)
- Meliola landolphiicola Hansf. (1945)
- Meliola lanigera Speg. (1909)
- Meliola lanneae Hosag. & Manojk. (2003)
- Meliola lanosa Pat. (1888)
- Meliola lantanae Syd. & P. Syd. (1914)
- Meliola lasiacidis Toro (1934)
- Meliola lasianthi Petr. (1959)
- Meliola laxa Gaillard (1892)
- Meliola leonensis Hansf. & Deighton (1948)
- Meliola leopoldina Theiss. (1914)
- Meliola lepianthis Hosag. & Kamar. (2001)
- Meliola lepisanthea Sacc. (1917)
- Meliola lepistemonis Hansf. (1937)
- Meliola leptactiniae Mibey (1997)
- Meliola leptidea Syd. & P. Syd. (1912)
- Meliola leptochaeta Syd. & P. Syd. (1917)
- Meliola leptoclada Syd. (1922)
- Meliola leptogoni (Cif.) Cif. (1961)
- Meliola leptopus Theiss. (1914)
- Meliola leptospermi Hansf. (1953)
- Meliola leptospora Gaillard (1892)
- Meliola leycesteriae A.K. Kar & Maity (1970)
- Meliola lianchangensis G.Z. Jiang (1995)
- Meliola lictorea Cif. (1938)
- Meliola ligustri Hosag. (1990)
- Meliola linacearum Hansf. & Deighton (1948)
- Meliola linderae W. Yamam. (1941)
- Meliola linhartiana Petr. (1950)
- Meliola linocierae-malabaricae Hosag. (1988)
- Meliola linocieriicola Hansf. (1949)
- Meliola linocierina Hansf. (1957)
- Meliola lippiae Maubl. (1903)
- Meliola lisianthi F. Stevens & Tehon (1926)
- Meliola lisianthicola Hansf. (1957)
- Meliola lithocarpigena X.Y. Zeng, K.D. Hyde & T.C. Wen (2020)
- Meliola lithocarpina W. Yamam. (1941)
- Meliola lithraeae Hansf. (1955)
- Meliola litoralis Syd. (1928)
- Meliola litseae-citrata Hansf. (1954)
- Meliola litseae-citratae Hansf. (1954)
- Meliola litseicola Hansf. (1946)
- Meliola littoralis Syd. (1928)
- Meliola livistonae H.S. Yates (1917)
- Meliola lobeliae F. Stevens (1925)
- Meliola lobeliicola M.L. Farr (1969)
- Meliola loganiensis Sacc. & Berl. (1885)
- Meliola lomandrae Hansf. (1953)
- Meliola lonchocarpicola F. Stevens (1928)
- Meliola longiappressoriata Mibey & P.F. Cannon (1999)
- Meliola longiseta Höhn. (1907)
- Meliola longispora (Gaillard) F. Stevens (1928)
- Meliola longistipitata F. Stevens (1928)
- Meliola lophopetali Hansf. (1957)
- Meliola lophopetaligena Hosag. & P.J. Robin (2011)
- Meliola loranthacearum Hosag. & T.K. Abraham (1998)
- Meliola loranthi Gaillard (1892)
- Meliola loropetalicola Y.X. Hu & Ouyang (1990)
- Meliola loxostylidis Doidge (1920)
- Meliola luculiae Hosag., Dhivah. & Riju (2011)
- Meliola lucumae F. Stevens (1916)
- Meliola ludibunda Speg. (1884)
- Meliola lundiae F. Stevens (1928)
- Meliola luvungae Hosag. (1990)
- Meliola luvungicola Hosag. & G. Rajkumar (2007)
- Meliola luzonensis Syd. & P. Syd. (1917)
- Meliola lychnodisci Deighton (1958)
- Meliola lyoniae F. Stevens (1925)

== M ==
- Meliola mabirensis Hansf. (1946)
- Meliola macalpinei Sacc. & P. Syd. (1899)
- Meliola macarangae Syd. & P. Syd. (1917)
- Meliola macarangicola Hansf. (1945)
- Meliola machili W. Yamam. (1941)
- Meliola mackenzieae Hosag., C.K. Biju & T.K. Abraham (2000)
- Meliola macracantha (Cif.) Hansf. (1961)
- Meliola macropoda Syd. (1926)
- Meliola macrospora R.E.D. Baker & W.T. Dale (1951)
- Meliola maculans (Kunze) Hansf. (1961)
- Meliola madhucae Hosag., Divya & Thimm. (2013)
- Meliola maduraiensis Hosag., Ravik. & Lakshm. (1992)
- Meliola maerenhoutiana Berk. & Broome (1873)
- Meliola maesae Rehm (1913)
- Meliola maesicola Hansf. & F. Stevens (1937)
- Meliola maesobotryae Hansf. & Deighton (1948)
- Meliola maesopsidis Hansf. (1947)
- Meliola magna F. Stevens (1928)
- Meliola magnoliae F. Stevens (1916)
- Meliola mahabaleshwarensis Srinivas. (1974)
- Meliola mahamulkarii Hosag., P.J. Robin & Archana (2010)
- Meliola maitlandii Hansf. (1946)
- Meliola makilingiana Syd. & P. Syd. (1917)
- Meliola malabarensis Hansf. (1946)
- Meliola malacotricha Speg. (1888)
- Meliola malaneae F. Stevens & Tehon (1926)
- Meliola malangasensis Hansf. (1957)
- Meliola malloti Srinivas. (1974)
- Meliola malouetiae Hansf. & Deighton (1948)
- Meliola malpighiacearum Hansf. (1955)
- Meliola mammeae Hansf. (1946)
- Meliola mammeicola Hansf. (1945)
- Meliola mandevillae F. Stevens (1928)
- Meliola mandingensis Hansf. (1957)
- Meliola mangiferae Earle (1905)
- Meliola manihot F. Stevens & Tehon (1926)
- Meliola manihoticola Henn. (1904)
- Meliola mannavanensis Hosag., C.K. Biju, T.K. Abraham & J.L. Crane (2000)
- Meliola mannii Hosag. (1990)
- Meliola manoasellae Hansf. (1957)
- Meliola manotis Hansf. & Deighton (1948)
- Meliola mapaniae H.S. Yates (1917)
- Meliola mappiae Cif. (1931)
- Meliola mappianthicola J.C. Yang (1989)
- Meliola marantacearum F. Stevens (1928)
- Meliola marantae F. Stevens (1928)
- Meliola marantochloae Hansf. (1946)
- Meliola maredumilliana Hosag. & M. Mohanan (1996)
- Meliola markhamiae Hansf. & F. Stevens (1937)
- Meliola marthomaensis Jac. Thomas, T.E. Alex & R.J. Thomas (2013)
- Meliola mataybae F. Stevens (1928)
- Meliola mattogrossensis Starbäck (1904)
- Meliola maurandiae Hansf. (1957)
- Meliola mauritiae F. Stevens (1928)
- Meliola mauritiana Hansf. (1955)
- Meliola mayaguesiana F. Stevens (1916)
- Meliola mayepeae F. Stevens (1916)
- Meliola mayepeicola F. Stevens (1916)
- Meliola medinillae Hansf. (1955)
- Meliola megalocarpa Syd. (1923)
- Meliola megalochaeta Syd. (1922)
- Meliola megalopoda Syd. & P. Syd. (1917)
- Meliola meghalayensis Hosag., Jac. Thomas & P.J. Robin (2009)
- Meliola meibomiae F. Stevens & Tehon (1926)
- Meliola melanochaeta Syd. (1928)
- Meliola melanochylae Hansf. (1954)
- Meliola melanococcae F. Stevens (1928)
- Meliola melanoxyli Hosag. & C.M. Pillai (1994)
- Meliola meliacearum F. Stevens & Roldan ex Hansf. (1963)
- Meliola melicopes Petr. (1959)
- Meliola meliosmae Petr. (1959)
- Meliola melochiae Hansf. (1957)
- Meliola melodini Hansf. (1953)
- Meliola membranacea Starbäck (1899)
- Meliola memecyli Syd. & P. Syd. (1917)
- Meliola memecylicola Hansf. (1957)
- Meliola mephitidiae W. Yamam. (1941)
- Meliola merremiae Rehm (1913)
- Meliola merrillii Syd. & P. Syd. (1913)
- Meliola mesuae Hosag., Jac. Thomas & D.K. Agarwal (2010)
- Meliola mezoneuri Hansf. & Deighton (1948)
- Meliola micheliae Hansf. (1947)
- Meliola micromeli T.K. Jana & S.N. Ghosh (2010)
- Meliola micromera Syd. & P. Syd. (1914)
- Meliola micropoda Hansf. (1946)
- Meliola microspora Pat. & Gaillard (1889)
- Meliola microthea Syd. (1939)
- Meliola microthecia Thüm. (1876)
- Meliola mikaniae Gaillard (1892)
- Meliola millettiae-chrysophyllae Deighton (1951)
- Meliola millettiae-racemosae Hosag. & M. Mohanan (1996)
- Meliola millettiae-rhodanthae Hansf. & Deighton (1948)
- Meliola millettiae-sanaganae Hansf. & Deighton (1948)
- Meliola mimosacearum Hansf. (1955)
- Meliola mimosicola Speg. (1924)
- Meliola miscantecae Hansf. (1957)
- Meliola mitchellae Cooke (1878)
- Meliola mitragynae Syd. & P. Syd. (1913)
- Meliola mitragynae-tubulosae Hosag. & Manojk. (2005)
- Meliola mitragynicola Deighton (1958)
- Meliola mitrephorae Hosag. & Rajendran (1989)
- Meliola modesta Syd. (1926)
- Meliola moerenhoutiana Mont. (1842)
- Meliola molfinoi Speg. (1924)
- Meliola mollinediae Theiss. (1914)
- Meliola mombasana Mibey (1997)
- Meliola monanthotaxis Mibey (1997)
- Meliola monensis F. Stevens (1916)
- Meliola monilipes Cif. (1954)
- Meliola monilispora Gaillard (1892)
- Meliola monnieriae F. Stevens (1928)
- Meliola monochroma Cif. (1957)
- Meliola monodorae Hansf. (1938)
- Meliola monopla Cif. (1954)
- Meliola montis-fontium B. Huguenin (1969)
- Meliola morbosa F. Stevens (1925)
- Meliola mori (Catt.) Sacc. (1882)
- Meliola morrowii F. Stevens (1928)
- Meliola motandrae Hansf. (1941)
- Meliola motatanensis Hansf. (1957)
- Meliola mouensis B. Huguenin (1969)
- Meliola mouriri Cif. (1931)
- Meliola mucunae Hansf. (1948)
- Meliola mucunae-acuminatae Hansf. (1954)
- Meliola mucunae-imbricatae T.K. Jana, S.N. Ghosh & A.K. Das (2005)
- Meliola mucunicola Hongsanan & K.D. Hyde (2015)
- Meliola muhakae Mibey & P.F. Cannon (1999)
- Meliola mulleri Toro (1940)
- Meliola multiseta Beeli (1927)
- Meliola musae (Kunze ex Fr.) Mont. (1856)
- Meliola mussaendae Syd. & P. Syd. (1917)
- Meliola mussaendae-arcuatae Hansf. (1958)
- Meliola mutabilis Hosag., Archana, Khaleel & Libina (2013)
- Meliola mutisiae Firmino, Pinho, Meir. Silva & O.L. Pereira (2012)
- Meliola mycetiae F. Stevens ex Deighton (1968)
- Meliola myricae Hansf. (1946)
- Meliola myricicola Hansf. (1947)
- Meliola myristicacearum Hosag. (2014)
- Meliola myristicae Hosag. & Raghu (1994)
- Meliola myrsinacearum F. Stevens (1916)
- Meliola myrtacearum F. Stevens & Roldan ex Hansf. (1963)

== N ==
- Meliola nairii Hosag. (1990)
- Meliola napoleonaeae Hansf. & Deighton (1948)
- Meliola nashii Hansf. (1955)
- Meliola neanotidis Hosag., C.K. Biju & T.K. Abraham (2005)
- Meliola neelikalluensis Hosag. & Divya (2013)
- Meliola negeriana Syd. & P. Syd. (1904)
- Meliola neolitseae W. Yamam. (1941)
- Meliola neotorta S. Hughes (1993)
- Meliola nepheliicola F. Stevens & A. Roldán ex W. Yamam. (1958)
- Meliola neurocalycis T.K. Jana, S.N. Ghosh & A.K. Das (2005)
- Meliola newbouldiae Hansf. & Deighton (1948)
- Meliola ngerechiana Mibey (1997)
- Meliola ngongensis Hansf. (1947)
- Meliola nicaraguensis Speg. (1921)
- Meliola nidulans (Schwein.) Cooke (1882)
- Meliola nigrorufescens Sacc. (1917)
- Meliola nilgirianthi Hosag. (1990)
- Meliola notabilis Petr. (1959)
- Meliola notelaeae Hansf. (1953)
- Meliola nothofagi B. Huguenin (1969)
- Meliola nothopegiae Hansf. (1957)
- Meliola nyanzae Hansf. (1938)

== O ==
- Meliola obtusifoliae Mibey (1997)
- Meliolaobvallata Syd. (1923)
- Meliolaochnae Doidge (1920)
- Meliolaochrocarpi Thite & S.D. Patil (1983)
- Meliolaochthocosmi Hansf. & Deighton (1948)
- Meliola ochthocosmicola Hansf. & Deighton (1948)
- Meliola ocimincola Petr. (1963)
- Meliola ocoteicola F. Stevens (1916)
- Meliola octoknemae Deighton (1951)
- Meliola odontocephala Syd. (1925)
- Meliola odontochaeta Syd. (1922)
- Meliola odoratissimae (J.N. Kapoor) Hosag. (1996)
- Meliola olacicola Hosag. (1996)
- Meliola olacis Deighton (1951)
- Meliola oldenlandiae Hansf. & F. Stevens (1937)
- Meliola oldenlandiicola Mibey (1997)
- Meliola oleacearum Hosag. (2002)
- Meliola oleariae Hansf. (1946)
- Meliola olecranonis F. Stevens & Tehon (1926)
- Meliola oleicola Doidge (1922)
- Meliola oligomera Syd. & P. Syd. (1917)
- Meliola oligopoda Syd. (1923)
- Meliola oncinotidis Doidge (1948)
- Meliola opaca Syd. & P. Syd. (1913)
- Meliola ophidiochaeta Cif. (1954)
- Meliola opiliae Syd. & P. Syd. (1913)
- Meliola opposita Syd. & P. Syd. (1913)
- Meliola opuntiae Hansf. (1957)
- Meliola orchidacearum Cif. (1938)
- Meliola ormocarpi Hansf. & Deighton (1948)
- Meliola ormosiae C.C. Chen (1967)
- Meliola osmanthi Syd. & P. Syd. (1921)
- Meliola osmanthiana Budathoki & P.N. Singh (1994)
- Meliola osmanthi-aquifolii Hara (1931)
- Meliola osmanthicola Hansf. (1955)
- Meliola osmanthi-cymosi B. Huguenin (1969)
- Meliola osmanthina Hansf. (1955)
- Meliola ostodis J.N. Kapoor (1967)
- Meliola ostryoderridis Hansf. & Deighton (1948)
- Meliola osyridicola Hansf. (1946)
- Meliola osyridis Doidge (1928)
- Meliola oteroana Hansf. (1957)
- Meliola otonephelii Hosag. (1990)
- Meliola otophorae H.S. Yates (1918)
- Meliola ougeiniae R.K. Verma, N. Sharma & Soni (2008)
- Meliola ourateae Hansf. & Deighton (1948)
- Meliola ouroupariae F. Stevens (1928)
- Meliola ovatipoda Hansf. & Thirum. (1948)
- Meliola oxerae B. Huguenin (1969)

== P ==
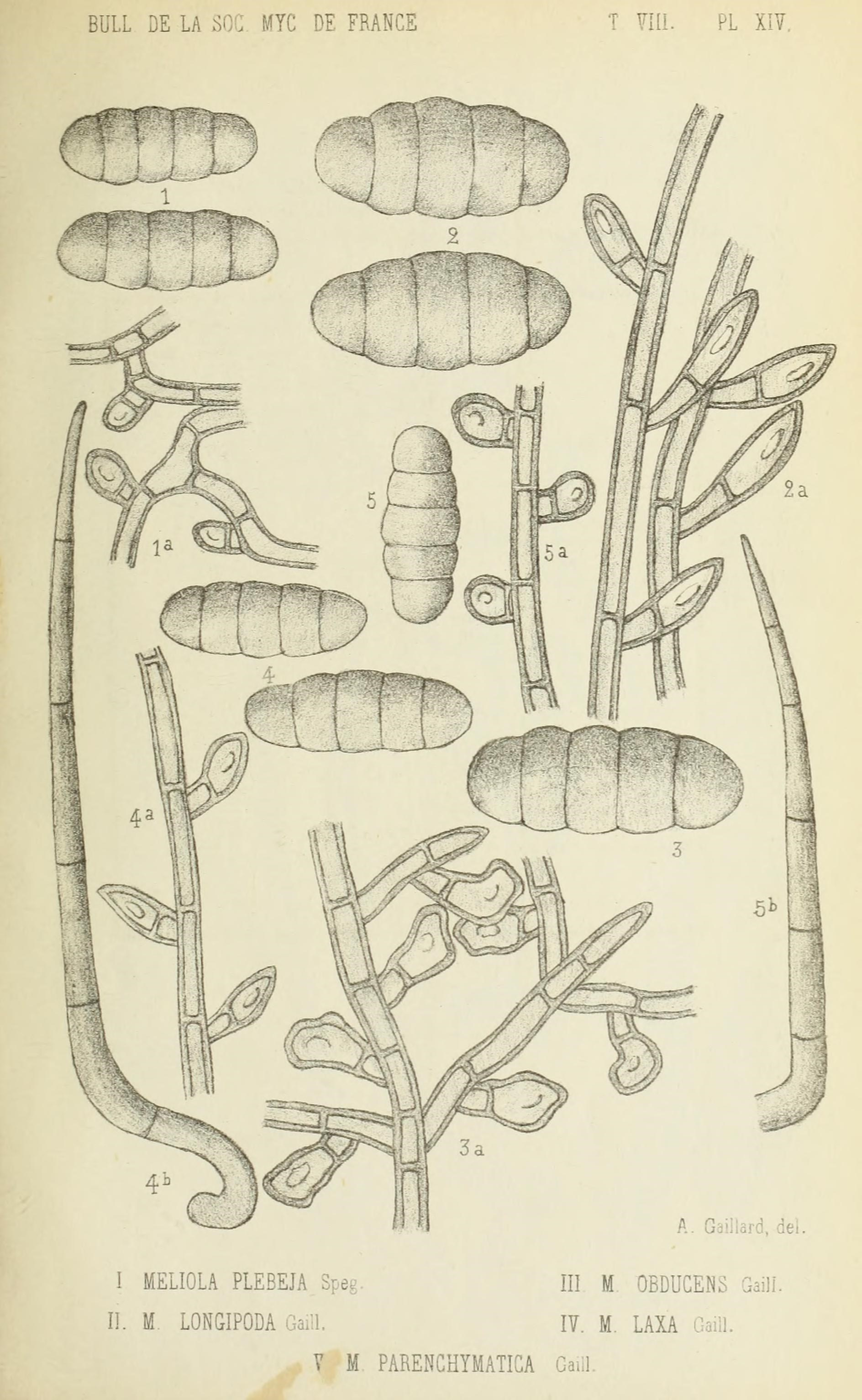
Plate XIV from Bulletin de la Société mycologique de France, 1892 which includes an illustration of Meliola parenchymatica Gaillard

- Meliola pachychaeta Syd. (1922)
- Meliola pachystelae Mibey (1997)
- Meliola pachytricha (Link ex Fr.) Sacc. (1882)
- Meliola palakkadensis Hosag., D.K. Agarwal, H. Biju & Archana (2007)
- Meliola palaquii F. Stevens & Roldan ex Hansf. (1963)
- Meliola palaquiicola Hansf. (1958)
- Meliola palawanensis Syd. & P. Syd. (1912)
- Meliola pallida F. Stevens (1928)
- Meliola palmicola G. Winter (1887)
- Meliola pampangensis Petr. (1959)
- Meliola panamensis F. Stevens (1928)
- Meliola pandanacearum Hosag. & T.K. Abraham (1999)
- Meliola pandani Syd. (1928)
- Meliola pandanicola Hansf. & Deighton (1948)
- Meliola panici Earle (1901)
- Meliola panicicola Syd. & P. Syd. (1914)
- Meliola papayae Deighton (1958)
- Meliola papillosae Bat. & H. Maia (1965)
- Meliola paraensis Henn. (1900)
- Meliola paralabatiae Cif. (1933)
- Meliola paramignyae Hosag. (1988)
- Meliola paraphialis Mibey (1997)
- Meliola parenchymatica Gaillard (1892)
- Meliola parishiae Hosag. (2014)
- Meliola paropsiae (Beeli) Hansf. (1961)
- Meliola parreirae Bat. (1960)
- Meliola parsonsiicola Hosag. (2006)
- Meliola parvifoliae Suj. Singh & Kamal (1982)
- Meliola parvula Syd. & P. Syd. (1913)
- Meliola patella Theiss. (1910)
- Meliola patens Syd. & P. Syd. (1912)
- Meliola patileana Hosag. (1996)
- Meliola patouillardii Gaillard (1892)
- Meliola paucipes F. Stevens (1916)
- Meliola pauciseta Hansf. (1955)
- Meliola paulliniae F. Stevens (1916)
- Meliola paulliniana Bat. & Nascim. (1956)
- Meliola paulliniicola Hansf. (1955)
- Meliola paulliniifoliae Bat. (1960)
- Meliola payakii Hosag. (1996)
- Meliola pazschkeana Gaillard (1892)
- Meliola pectinata Höhn. (1909)
- Meliola peddiicola Hansf. (1947)
- Meliola peleae F. Stevens (1925)
- Meliola pelliculosa Syd. & P. Syd. (1913)
- Meliola pellucida Gaillard (1892)
- Meliola peltata Doidge (1917)
- Meliola penicillata Lév. (1846)
- Meliola pennata Höhn. (1909)
- Meliola pentadis Mibey (1997)
- Meliola pentaphylacis B. Song & Y.X. Hu (1997)
- Meliola pepparaensis Hosag. & T.K. Abraham (1998)
- Meliola pequensis Hosag., T.K. Abraham & J.L. Crane (1998)
- Meliola perae Hansf. (1955)
- Meliola perexigua Gaillard (1892)
- Meliola pericampyli W. Yamam. (1941)
- Meliola peringamalensis Hosag. & Kamar. (2006)
- Meliola periplocae Mibey (1999)
- Meliola periyakanalensis Hosag. & Divya (2013)
- Meliola permixta Syd. (1923)
- Meliola perpusilla Syd. & P. Syd. (1913)
- Meliola peruiferi Pinho, O.L. Pereira, Firmino, Meir. Silva, Ferreira-Junior & Barreto (2012)
- Meliola petalostigmatis Hansf. (1953)
- Meliola petchii Hansf. (1946)
- Meliola petiolariicola Mibey (1997)
- Meliola petiolaris Doidge (1920)
- Meliola petitiae Hansf. (1955)
- Meliola petiveriae Hansf. (1963)
- Meliola petraeoviticis Deighton (1958)
- Meliola phaeocephala Cif. (1954)
- Meliola phaeomaculans Mibey & P.F. Cannon (1999)
- Meliola phaseoli Thite ex Hosag. (1996)
- Meliola philippinensis (F. Stevens) Hansf. (1961)
- Meliola philodendri F. Stevens (1916)
- Meliola philodendricola Hansf. (1955)
- Meliola phoebes Hansf. (1949)
- Meliola phthirusae Hansf. (1957)
- Meliola phyllanthicola Hansf. & Deighton (1957)
- Meliola phyllanthigena Hosag. (2013)
- Meliola phyllostachydis W. Yamam. (1941)
- Meliola physostigmatis Hansf. & Deighton (1948)
- Meliola phytolaccae Hansf. & F. Stevens (1937)
- Meliola phytolaccae-dioicae Hansf. (1957)
- Meliola picramniae Hansf. (1957)
- Meliola picrasmae Hansf. (1955)
- Meliola pictetiae Hansf. (1955)
- Meliola pileostegiae W. Yamam. (1941)
- Meliola pilocarpi F. Stevens (1916)
- Meliola pinnatae Mibey (1997)
- Meliola piperina Syd. & P. Syd. (1916)
- Meliola piperis Earle (1901)
- Meliola piperis-barbati Hansf. (1955)
- Meliola piptadeniae Hansf. & Deighton (1948)
- Meliola pisoniae F. Stevens & A. Roldán ex W. Yamam. (1958)
- Meliola pisoniicola F. Stevens & Roldan ex Hansf. (1963)
- Meliola pistaciicola X.Y. Zeng, K.D. Hyde & T.C. Wen (2020)
- Meliola pithecellobii F. Stevens & Tehon (1926)
- Meliola pithecellobiicola Speg. (1924)
- Meliola pittospori Hansf. (1955)
- Meliola plantaginis Hansf. & F. Stevens (1937)
- Meliola platyphyllae T.K. Jana, S.N. Ghosh & A.K. Das (2005)
- Meliola platysepali Hansf. & Deighton (1948)
- Meliola platysperma Theiss. (1914)
- Meliola plectroniae Hansf. (1955)
- Meliola pleioceratis Hansf. (1957)
- Meliola pleurostyliicola Hosag. & T. Sabu (2007)
- Meliola plumbaginis Hansf. & F. Stevens (1937)
- Meliola podocarpicola Y.X. Hu & B. Song (1992)
- Meliola pogostemonis Hansf. (1957)
- Meliola polyalthiae Hansf. (1955)
- Meliola polygoni Srinivas. (1974)
- Meliola polygonicola Hosag. (1996)
- Meliola polyodonta Syd. (1926)
- Meliola polysciadis Hansf. (1946)
- Meliola polytricha Kalchbr. & Cooke (1879)
- Meliola pomaderridis Hansf. (1946)
- Meliola pomaderris Hansf. (1946)
- Meliola pongamiae Hosag. & T.K. Abraham (1999)
- Meliola pontualii A.F. Vital (1947)
- Meliola pottsiae X.Y. Zeng, K.D. Hyde & T.C. Wen (2020)
- Meliola praetervisa Gaillard (1892)
- Meliola prataprajii Hosag. & T.K. Abraham (1996)
- Meliola premnae Hansf. (1949)
- Meliola premnicola Hosag. (1990)
- Meliola premnigena Hosag. & Riju (2011)
- Meliola procera Cif. (1938)
- Meliola prostantherae Hansf. (1953)
- Meliola protii F. Stevens (1928)
- Meliola protiicola Mig. Rodr. (2000)
- Meliola pseudarthriae Hosag. & Manojk. (2004)
- Meliola pseudocapensis Hansf. (1955)
- Meliola pseudomori Hansf. (1953)
- Meliola pseudoradiata Cif. (1954)
- Meliola pseudosasae I. Hino (1958)
- Meliola pseudospondiadis Hansf. & Deighton (1948)
- Meliola psidii Fr. (1830)
- Meliola psidiicola Hongsanan & K.D. Hyde (2015)
- Meliola psophocarpi Hosag. & Riju (2010)
- Meliola psychotriae Earle (1905)
- Meliola psychotriae-nudiflorae Hosag. (1996)
- Meliola ptaeroxyli Doidge (1941)
- Meliola pterocarpi H.S. Yates (1918)
- Meliola pterocarpicola Hansf. & Deighton (1948)
- Meliola pterocelastri J.L. Crane & A.G. Jones (2001)
- Meliola pterospermi F. Stevens (1928)
- Meliola pterospermicola F. Stevens & Roldan ex Hansf. (1963)
- Meliola pterygotae Hosag., D.K. Agarwal, H. Biju & Archana (2006)
- Meliola pudukadensis Hosag. (1988)
- Meliola puerariae X.Y. Zeng, K.D. Hyde & T.C. Wen (2020)
- Meliola pulchella Speg. (1889)
- Meliola pululahuensis Gaillard (1892)
- Meliola pumila Syd. (1925)
- Meliola pushpangadanii Hosag. & T.K. Abraham (1998)
- Meliola pycnanthi Hansf. (1957)
- Meliola pycnosporae Hosag. & Archana (2009)
- Meliola pycnostachydis Hansf. (1938)
- Meliola pygeicola Hosag. (2013)

== Q ==
- Meliola quadrifurcata Rehm (1913)
- Meliola quadrispina Racib. (1900)
- Meliola queenslandica (E.E. Fisher) Hansf. (1953)
- Meliola quercicola H. Hu (1991)
- Meliola quinqueseptata Rehm (1878)

== R ==
- Meliola racemosae Mibey (1997)
- Meliola radhanagariensis Hosag. (1996)
- Meliola rajamalaensis Hosag., C.K. Biju & T.K. Abraham (2005)
- Meliola ramacharii Hosag. (1989)
- Meliola ramicola Hansf. (1938)
- Meliola ramosii Syd. & P. Syd. (1914)
- Meliola ramulicola W. Yamam. (1941)
- Meliola randiae Hansf. & Deighton (1948)
- Meliola randiae-aculeatae Hansf. (1955)
- Meliola randiicola Hansf. (1954)
- Meliola ranganathii Hansf. (1946)
- Meliola rapaneae Syd. (1928)
- Meliola rauvolfiae Mibey (1997)
- Meliola ravii Hosag., C.K. Biju & T.K. Abraham (2005)
- Meliola rechingeri Hansf. (1958)
- Meliola recurvipoda Hansf. (1957)
- Meliola reevesiae Maity (1978)
- Meliola reflexa Hansf. (1941)
- Meliola regiae Hansf. (1955)
- Meliola rehmii F. Stevens (1928)
- Meliola reinkingii Syd. & P. Syd. (1920)
- Meliola reinwardtiodendri Hosag. (1996)
- Meliola reinwardtiodendricola Hosag. & Divya (2009)
- Meliola remireae Bat. (1960)
- Meliola renovata Cif. (1954)
- Meliola rhamnicola F. Stevens & Tehon (1926)
- Meliola rhodoleiicola H. Hu (1990)
- Meliola rhoina Doidge (1928)
- Meliola rhois Henn. (1893)
- Meliola rickiana Hansf. (1955)
- Meliola rickii Hansf. (1955)
- Meliola rigida Doidge (1917)
- Meliola ripogoni Hansf. (1953)
- Meliola rizalensis Syd. & P. Syd. (1914)
- Meliola robinsonii Syd. (1922)
- Meliola rockstonensis Hansf. (1957)
- Meliola roureae Syd. & P. Syd. (1917)
- Meliola rubi F. Stevens & Roldan ex Hansf. (1963)
- Meliola rubiacearum Mibey (1997)
- Meliola rubicola Henn. (1904)
- Meliola rubiella Hansf. (1957)
- Meliola rubifolii Mibey (1997)
- Meliola rudolphiae F. Stevens (1916)

== S ==
- Meliola sabiceae Cif. (1954)
- Meliola saccardoi (Syd. & P. Syd.) Syd. (1922)
- Meliola sacchari Syd. & P. Syd. (1914)
- Meliola sairandhriana Hosag. & Archana (2009)
- Meliola sakawensis Henn. (1904)
- Meliola salaciae Hansf. (1946)
- Meliola salaciicola Hosag., D.K. Agarwal, H. Biju & Archana (2007)
- Meliola salleana Hansf. (1963)
- Meliola samaderae Hosag., Ponnusamy & C.K. Biju (2003)
- Meliola samarensis H.S. Yates (1917)
- Meliola sambuci Hansf. (1954)
- Meliola samydae Cif. (1931)
- Meliola sandwicensis Ellis & Everh. (1895)
- Meliola sanjappae Hosag., Jac. Thomas & D.K. Agarwal (2010)
- Meliola sansevieriae Wakef. (1937)
- Meliola santalacearum Budathoki & P.N. Singh (1994)
- Meliola sapiicola Y.X. Hu & B. Song (1997)
- Meliola sapindacearum Speg. (1891)
- Meliola sapindi F. Stevens (1928)
- Meliola sapindi-esculenti Hansf. (1955)
- Meliola sapotacearum Mig. Rodr. & Camino (1987)
- Meliola sarcostigmaticola Hosag. & T.K. Abraham (1999)
- Meliola sarcostigmatis Hosag. (1990)
- Meliola saurauiae Syd. (1939)
- Meliola sauropicola H.S. Yates (1917)
- Meliola savarkarii Hosag. (2014)
- Meliola sawadae B. Song (2004)
- Meliola scabriseta Hansf. & Deighton (1948)
- Meliola scaevolae Syd. & P. Syd. (1914)
- Meliola schefflerae Hansf. (1954)
- Meliola schimae Hansf. (1954)
- Meliola schimicola W. Yamam. (1940)
- Meliola schimigena X.Y. Zeng, K.D. Hyde & T.C. Wen (2020)
- Meliola schizolobii Syd. & P. Syd. (1916)
- Meliola schlechterinae Mibey (1997)
- Meliola schoepfiae B. Song & Y.X. Hu (1997)
- Meliola schwarzii Hansf. (1954)
- Meliola schwenckiicola Hansf. (1955)
- Meliola sclerochitonis Hansf. (1938)
- Meliola sclerolobii Hansf. (1955)
- Meliola scleropyri Hosag. (1990)
- Meliola scolopiae Doidge (1928)
- Meliola scolopoliicola H. Biju & Bagool (2004)
- Meliola scott-elliotii Hansf. & Deighton (1957)
- Meliola scutiae Speg. (1912)
- Meliola scytopetali Hansf. & Deighton (1948)
- Meliola secamones Hansf. (1944)
- Meliola securidacicola Hansf. (1961)
- Meliola semecarpi Syd. (1923)
- Meliola semecarpi-anacardii Hosag., Kaver., Raghu & Goos (1994)
- Meliola semecarpicola Hansf. (1958)
- Meliola sempeiensis W. Yamam. (1941)
- Meliola serdangensis Hansf. (1957)
- Meliola serjaniae F. Stevens (1916)
- Meliola serjaniicola F. Stevens & Tehon (1926)
- Meliola sersalisiae Hansf. (1944)
- Meliola sesami Hansf. & Deighton (1957)
- Meliola setariae Hansf. & Deighton (1948)
- Meliola shettyi Hosag., C.M. Pillai & Raghu (1996)
- Meliola shiiae W. Yamam. (1941)
- Meliola shillongensis Hosag., Jac. Thomas & P.J. Robin (2009)
- Meliola shimbaensis Mibey (1997)
- Meliola shivarajui Hosag. & Kamar. (2002)
- Meliola sideroxyli F. Stevens (1925)
- Meliola sideroxylicola J.A. Stev. (1969)
- Meliola silentvalleyensis Hosag. (2006)
- Meliola simaoensis B. Song & Goos (2002)
- Meliola simillima Ellis & Everh. (1898)
- Meliola singaporensis Hansf. (1946)
- Meliola sinuosa Doidge (1917)
- Meliola siparunae Syd. (1929)
- Meliola smallii Hansf. & F. Stevens (1937)
- Meliola smeathmanniae Hansf. & Deighton (1948)
- Meliola smilacacearum Hosag. (2006)
- Meliola smilacis F. Stevens (1916)
- Meliola snowdenii Hansf. & F. Stevens (1937)
- Meliola solteroi Hansf. (1957)
- Meliola sordidula (Lév.) Berl. & Sacc. (1886)
- Meliola sorindeiae Hansf. & Deighton (1948)
- Meliola soroceae Speg. (1912)
- Meliola soroceana Bat. (1953)
- Meliola sparsipoda Hansf. (1955)
- Meliola spartinae (Ellis & Everh.) Berl. & Voglino (1886)
- Meliola spegazziniana G. Winter (1888)
- Meliola sphaeropoda Cif. (1938)
- Meliola spigeliae Hansf. (1955)
- Meliola spinigera Speg. (1881)
- Meliola spirobelia Bat. & M.P. Herrera (1965)
- Meliola standleyi Hansf. (1955)
- Meliola staphyleacearum Hosag. (1991)
- Meliola stemonae Syd. (1922)
- Meliola stemonuri Hosag. (1990)
- Meliola stenocarpi B. Huguenin (1969)
- Meliola stenospora G. Winter (1886)
- Meliola stenotaphri F. Stevens (1916)
- Meliola stephaniae Hansf. (1954)
- Meliola sterculiacearum Hosag. & Kamar. (2005)
- Meliola sterculiae Hansf. & Deighton (1948)
- Meliola sterculiicola Hosag. & P.J. Robin (2011)
- Meliola stevensiana Cif. (1954)
- Meliola stevensii Beeli (1920)
- Meliola stixis B. Song & T.H. Li (2002)
- Meliola stizolobii Hansf. & Deighton (1948)
- Meliola straussiae Hansf. (1957)
- Meliola strebli Hosag. & Archana (2009)
- Meliola strobilanthicola Hosag., C.K. Biju & T.K. Abraham (2005)
- Meliola strombosiicola Hosag. (2013)
- Meliola strombosiigena Hosag. & Riju (2011)
- Meliola strophanthicola Hansf. (1961)
- Meliola strychnacearum Hosag. & T.K. Abraham (1998)
- Meliola strychni Mibey (1997)
- Meliola strychnicola Gaillard (1892)
- Meliola strychnigena Hosag. & Manojk. (2004)
- Meliola strychni-multiflorae Hansf. (1958)
- Meliola strychni-nux-vomicae Gawande, D.K. Agarwal & Hosag. (2004)
- Meliola styracearum F. Stevens (1928)
- Meliola styracina Hansf. (1957)
- Meliola styracis W. Yamam. (1941)
- Meliola subdentata Pat. (1897)
- Meliola subpellucida W. Yamam. (1941)
- Meliola subramanyaensis Hosag. (2005)
- Meliola substenospora Höhn. (1909)
- Meliola subtortuosa Rehm (1901)
- Meliola sudanensis Hansf. (1957)
- Meliola suisyaensis W. Yamam. (1940)
- Meliola surattensis Hosag., T.K. Abraham & J.L. Crane (1998)
- Meliola suttonii Hosag., C.K. Biju & T.K. Abraham (2005)
- Meliola sweetiae W.R.O. Soares & Dianese (2013)
- Meliola swieteniae Cif. (1933)
- Meliola swieteniicola Hosag., Kaver., Raghu & Goos (1994)
- Meliola sydowiana F. Stevens & Larson (1928)
- Meliola sydowii Hansf. (1949)
- Meliola symingtoniae J.N. Kapoor (1967)
- Meliola symphorematicola Hosag., Udaiyan & Goos (1994)
- Meliola symphorematis Petr. (1959)
- Meliola symplocacearum W. Yamam. (1941)
- Meliola symploci W. Yamam. (1940)
- Meliola symplocicola W. Yamam. (1941)
- Meliola syzygii-benthamiani Hosag. & T.K. Abraham (1998)
- Meliola syzygiigena Hosag. & Kamar. (2003)

== T ==
- Meliola tabernaemontanae Speg. (1912)
- Meliola tabernaemontanicola Hansf. & Thirum. (1948)
- Meliola tahitensis Pat. ex Hansf. (1961)
- Meliola taitensis Mibey & P.F. Cannon (1999)
- Meliola taityuensis W. Yamam. (1941)
- Meliola taiwaniana W. Yamam. (1941)
- Meliola talaumae Hansf. (1954)
- Meliola talisiana Bat. & H. Maia (1956)
- Meliola tamarindi Syd. & P. Syd. (1912)
- Meliola tanakaeana I. Hino & Katum. (1957)
- Meliola tapirirae F. Stevens & Tehon (1926)
- Meliola tapiriricola F. Stevens & Tehon (1926)
- Meliola tapisciicola H. Hu (1990)
- Meliola tawaoensis Hansf. (1957)
- Meliola tayabensis H.S. Yates (1917)
- Meliola tecleae Hansf. (1941)
- Meliola tecomae F. Stevens (1916)
- Meliola tectonae T.K. Jana, S.N. Ghosh & A.K. Das (2005)
- Meliola teke Hansf. (1946)
- Meliola telensis Hansf. (1957)
- Meliola telosmae Rehm (1913)
- Meliola tenella Pat. (1888)
- Meliola teramni Syd. & P. Syd. (1917)
- Meliola teramni H.S. Yates (1917)
- Meliola teramnicola Hosag., C.K. Biju & T.K. Abraham (2005)
- Meliola terecitensis Hansf. (1957)
- Meliola ternstroemiicola Hosag. (2014)
- Meliola tetracerae F. Muell. & Thüm. (1878)
- Meliola tetradeniae (Berk.) Theiss. & Syd. (1914)
- Meliola tetrorchidiicola Hansf. (1957)
- Meliola thailandicum Hongsanan & K.D. Hyde (2015)
- Meliola thalliformis Deighton (1958)
- Meliola thaxteri Hansf. (1961)
- Meliola theacearum F. Stevens (1928)
- Meliola theissenii Hansf. (1957)
- Meliola themedae F. Stevens & Roldan ex Hansf. (1963)
- Meliola themedicola Hosag., C.K. Biju & T.K. Abraham (2005)
- Meliola theobromae Faber (1909)
- Meliola thirumalacharii Hosag. & Rajendran (1989)
- Meliola thiruvananthapurica Hosag. & T.K. Abraham (1999)
- Meliola thiteana Hosag. (1996)
- Meliola thitei Hosag. (1996)
- Meliola thiyagesanii Hosag., Dhivah. & Nithyath. (2010)
- Meliola thollonis Gaillard (1892)
- Meliola thomandersiae Hansf. (1958)
- Meliola thomasiana Sacc. (1905)
- Meliola thouiniae Earle (1905)
- Meliola thuemeniana F. Stevens (1928)
- Meliola thunbergiae Hansf. (1935)
- Meliola thunbergiicola Hansf. & Deighton (1948)
- Meliola thwaitesiana Hansf. (1957)
- Meliola tibigirica Hosag. & T.K. Abraham (1997)
- Meliola tieghemopanacis B. Huguenin (1969)
- Meliola tijucensis Hansf. (1955)
- Meliola tinctoriae Mibey (1997)
- Meliola tinomisciicola Y.X. Hu & Ouyang (1993)
- Meliola toddaliae Doidge (1917)
- Meliola toddaliicola Hansf. (1947)
- Meliola togoensis S. Hughes (1953)
- Meliola tonduzii Speg. (1918)
- Meliola toonae Hosag. & T. Sabu (2001)
- Meliola toreniae Hosag. (1996)
- Meliola torricelliae A.K. Kar & Maity (1970)
- Meliola torulipes Cif. (1938)
- Meliola torulosiseta Hansf. (1957)
- Meliola torulosispora M.L. Farr (1987)
- Meliola tounateae F. Stevens (1928)
- Meliola toxocarpi Hosag. & V.T. Antony (1988)
- Meliola trachelospermi H.S. Yates (1918)
- Meliola tragiae Hosag. & Thimm. (2013)
- Meliola transvaalensis Doidge (1927)
- Meliola travancoricae Hosag. (1991)
- Meliola trewiae Hosag. (1991)
- Meliola tricalysiae Deighton (1958)
- Meliola trichiliae Beeli (1920)
- Meliola trichiliicola Speg. (1924)
- Meliola trichocarpa Cif. (1938)
- Meliola trichoscyphae Hansf. & Deighton (1957)
- Meliola trichostroma (Kunze) Toro (1952)
- Meliola tridentata Hansf. (1955)
- Meliola trifurcata Cif. (1938)
- Meliola trilepisii Mibey & P.F. Cannon (1999)
- Meliola trinidadensis F. Stevens & Tehon (1926)
- Meliola triplochitonis S. Hughes (1953)
- Meliola trujillensis Toro (1934)
- Meliola tumatumariensis Hansf. (1957)
- Meliola tumor F. Stevens (1928)
- Meliola tungurahuana Syd. (1939)
- Meliola tunkiaensis Hansf. & Deighton (1948)
- Meliola turraeae Hansf. (1944)
- Meliola tylophorae Hosag. (1990)
- Meliola tylophorae-indicae Hosag. & Manojk. (2004)

== U ==
- Meliola ugandensis Hansf. (1937)
- Meliola uleana Pazschke (1892)
- Meliola ulei Hansf. (1949)
- Meliola uncariicola Deighton (1958)
- Meliola uncinata Syd. (1925)
- Meliola uncitricha Syd. (1926)
- Meliola unonae Hosag. & T.K. Abraham (1998)
- Meliola unonicola Hosag. & T.K. Abraham (1997)
- Meliola urariae Hosag. (2004)
- Meliola urceolae Hansf. (1954)
- Meliola usteriae Hansf. & Deighton (1948)
- Meliola uvariicola Hansf. (1945)

== V ==
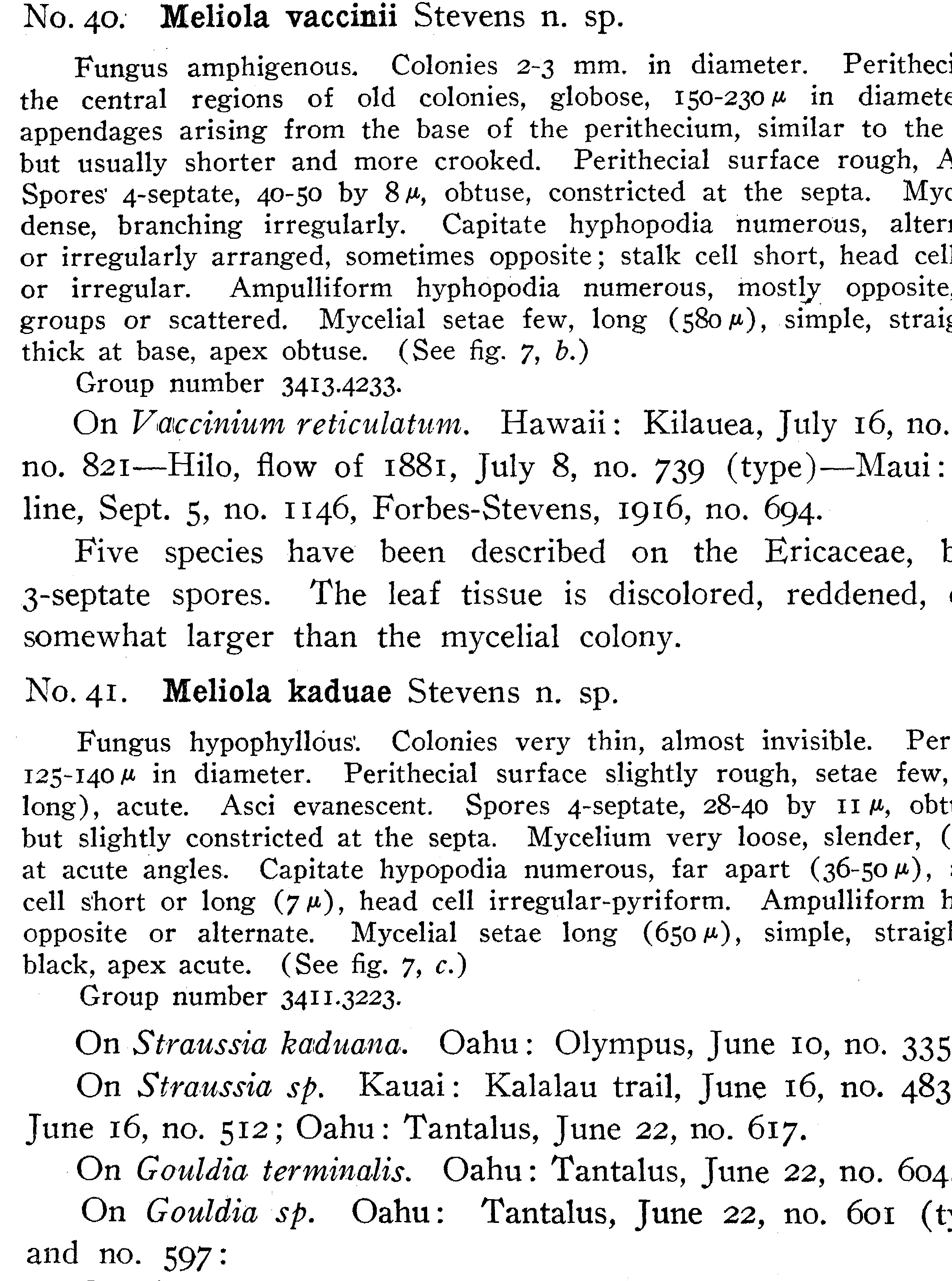
Text from Page 35 of Hawaiian Fungi book by Frank Lincoln Stevens, 1925

- Meliola vaccinii F. Stevens (1925)
- Meliola vanderystii Hansf. (1957)
- Meliola varia Doidge (1917)
- Meliola variaseta F. Stevens (1928)
- Meliola varicuspis F. Stevens & Tehon (1926)
- Meliola vazhachalensis Hosag. & Jac. Thomas (2009)
- Meliola velutina G. Winter (1886)
- Meliola venezuelana Garcés (1944)
- Meliola ventilaginicola Hansf. (1946)
- Meliola ventilaginis W. Yamam. (1941)
- Meliola vepridis Hosag., Kaver., Raghu & Goos (1994)
- Meliola verbenacearum Mibey (1997)
- Meliola vernalis Pinho, O.L. Pereira, Firmino, Meir. Silva, Ferreira-Junior & Barreto (2012)
- Meliola viburnicola Hansf. (1955)
- Meliola vicina Syd. & P. Syd. (1923)
- Meliola vicosensis Pinho & O.L. Pereira (2013)
- Meliola vignae-gracilis Hansf. & Deighton (1948)
- Meliola villaresiae Henn. (1897)
- Meliola villaresiana Hansf. (1957)
- Meliola villaresiicola Speg. (1924)
- Meliola visci F. Stevens (1925)
- Meliola viticicola Hansf. (1945)
- Meliola viticis-pinnatae H. Biju & Bagool (2004)
- Meliola viticola Hansf. (1945)
- Meliola vitis Hansf. (1947)
- Meliola vittalii Hosag., C.K. Biju & T.K. Abraham (2005)
- Meliola vivekananthanii Hosag., C.K. Biju & T.K. Abraham (2005)
- Meliola voacangae Hansf. & F. Stevens (1937)
- Meliola voacangae-foetidae Hansf. (1954)
- Meliola voacangicola Hansf. (1958)

== W ==
- Meliola wainioi Pat. (1890)
- Meliola walsurae Hansf. (1958)
- Meliola walsuricola Bagool & H. Biju (2004)
- Meliola warburgiae Mibey (1999)
- Meliola wardii F. Stevens (1928)
- Meliola warneckei Hansf. (1955)
- Meliola weberae J.N. Kapoor (1967)
- Meliola weigeltii J. Kunze (1817)
- Meliola wendlandiae Hosag. (1990)
- Meliola wenshanensis G.Z. Jiang (1987)
- Meliola whetzelii Hansf. (1957)
- Meliola wikstroemiicola Hansf. (1958)
- Meliola willoughbyae Zimm. (1901)
- Meliola wismarensis F. Stevens (1928)
- Meliola woodfordiae Srinivas. (1974)
- Meliola woodiana Sacc. (1899)
- Meliola wormiae Hansf. (1953)
- Meliola wrightiae H.S. Yates (1918)

== X Y Z ==
- Meliola xenoderma Syd. (1926)
- Meliola xumenensis Doidge (1941)
- Meliola xylopiae F. Stevens (1928)
- Meliola xylopiae-sericeae Pinho & O.L. Pereira (2013)
- Meliola xylosmae F. Stevens (1928)
- Meliola xylosmae-buxifoliae Deighton (1968)
- Meliola xylosmicola Garcés (1944)
- Meliola yangambiensis Hansf. (1947)
- Meliola yaquensis Petr. & Cif. (1932)
- Meliola yatesiana Trotter (1926)
- Meliola yuanjiangensis G.Z. Jiang (1989)
- Meliola yunnanensis G.Z. Jiang (1987)
- Meliola zambalesica Petr. (1959)
- Meliola zamboagensis Hansf. (1957)
- Meliola zangii B. Song (2003)
- Meliola zanthoxyli Hansf. (1947)
- Meliola zanthoxyli-ovalifolii Hosag. (1996)
- Meliola zetekii F. Stevens (1928)
- Meliola zigzac Berk. & M.A. Curtis (1868)
- Meliola ziziphi Hansf. & Thirum. (1948)
- Meliola zollingeri Gaillard (1892)
