= M. phyllostachydis =

M. phyllostachydis may refer to:

- Meliola phyllostachydis, W. Yamam, a fungus species of the genus Meliola
- Mycosphaerella phyllostachydis, a plant pathogen fungus species of the genus Mycosphaerella
