= Meliola zangii =

Scientific classification
- Domain: Eukaryota
- Kingdom: Fungi
- Division: Ascomycota
- Class: Sordariomycetes
- Order: Meliolales
- Family: Meliolaceae
- Genus: Meliola
- Species: M. zangii

Binomial name
- Meliola zangii B.Song (2003)

Species of fungus

Meliola zangii is a species of fungus in the family Meliolaceae that is found in China. It was described as new to science in 2003 by Bin Song. The specific epithet honours mycologist Mu Zang, who collected the type specimen on 22 September 1974. The type collection was made in Menghai, Yunnan Province, from leaves of a Ficus plant. The fungus grows on the plant in the form of black, velvety spots up to 3 mm in diameter. The perithecia are spherical and black, and up to 150 μm in diameter. Ascospores produced by the fungus are brown and oblong, measuring 30–35 by 10–13 μm. They have four septa, and are constricted at these septa.
