= Meliola evansii =

Scientific classification
- Domain: Eukaryota
- Kingdom: Fungi
- Division: Ascomycota
- Class: Sordariomycetes
- Order: Meliolales
- Family: Meliolaceae
- Genus: Meliola
- Species: M. evansii

Binomial name
- Meliola evansii Doidge, 1920

Synonyms
- Meliola evansii var. indica (Hosag.) J.L. Crane & A.G. Jone; Meliola evansii var. zeylanica (Hansf.) J.L. Crane & A.G. Jones; Meliola scolopiae var. indica Hosag. Meliola scolopiae var. zeylanica Hansf.

Fungus

Meliola evansii is a fungus in the family Meliolaceae. It has been seen in Mozambique, South Africa, and the Cook Islands. It has been recorded to be hosted by Maytenus acuminata.
