= Meliola mangiferae =

Scientific classification
- Kingdom: Fungi
- Division: Ascomycota
- Class: Sordariomycetes
- Order: Meliolales
- Family: Meliolaceae
- Genus: Meliola
- Species: M. mangiferae

Binomial name
- Meliola mangiferae Earle, (1905)

Species of fungus

Meliola mangiferae, also described as black mildew, is a plant pathogen.
