= Meliola brevispora =

Scientific classification
- Domain: Eukaryota
- Kingdom: Fungi
- Division: Ascomycota
- Class: Sordariomycetes
- Order: Meliolales
- Family: Meliolaceae
- Genus: Meliola
- Species: M. brevispora

Binomial name
- Meliola brevispora M.L.Farr

Species of fungus

Meliola brevispora is a species of fungus in the family Meliolaceae. It was first described in 1987 by Marie Farr, from a specimen found on the leaves of a plant in the family, Guttiferae, in Brazil.
