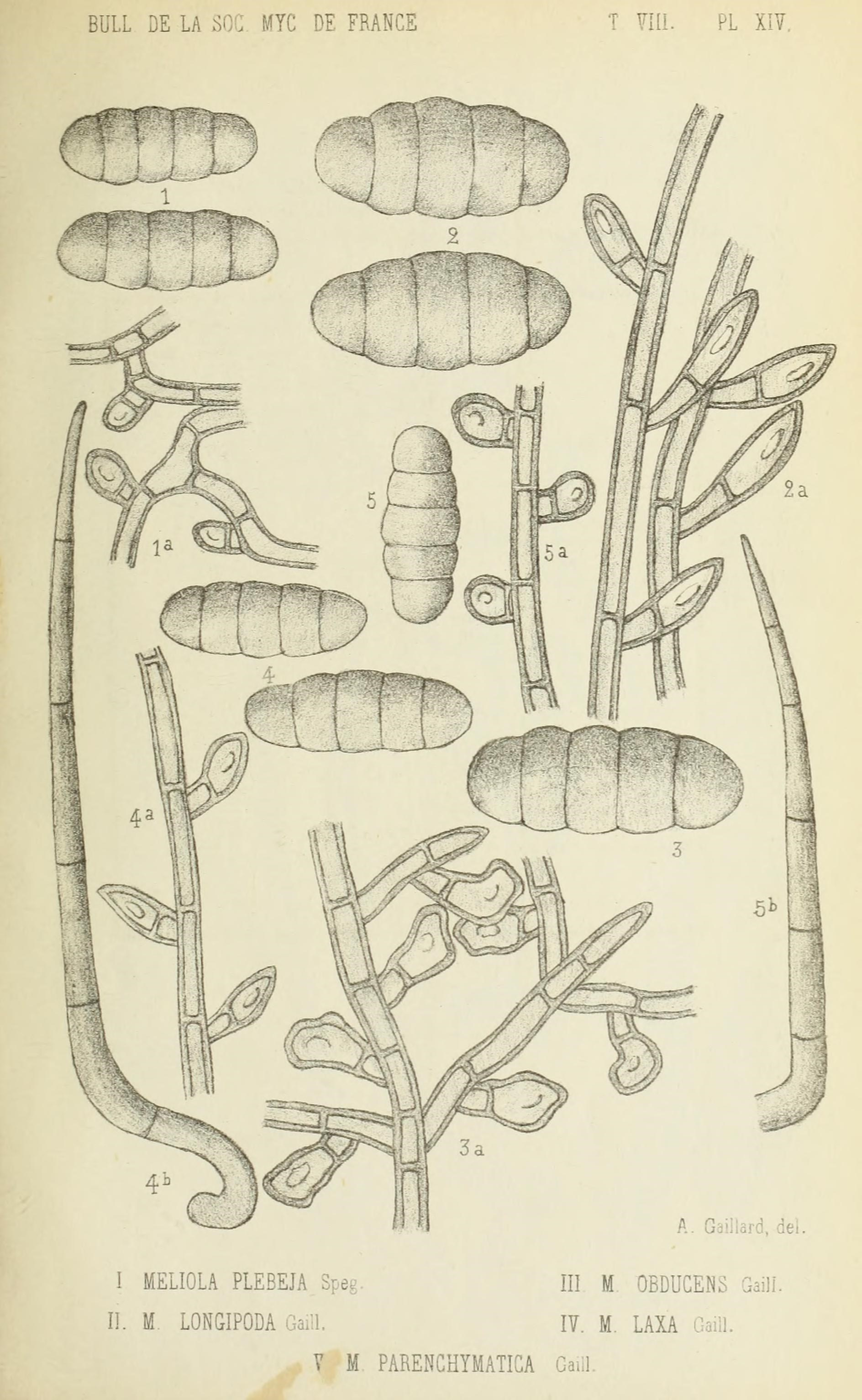
- I. Meliola plebeja Speg. II. Meliola longipoda Gaill. III. Meliola obducens Gaill. IV. Meliola laxa Gaill. V. Meliola parenchymatica Gaill.

Scientific classification
- Domain: Eukaryota
- Kingdom: Fungi
- Division: Ascomycota
- Class: Sordariomycetes
- Order: Meliolales
- Family: Meliolaceae
- Genus: Meliola; Fr. (1825)

Type species
- Meliola nidulans (Schwein.) Cooke (1882)

Synonyms
- Arberia Nieuwl. (1916); Asteridium (Sacc.) Speg. ex Sacc. (1891); Asterina subgen. Asteridium Sacc. (1882); Chaetomeliola (Cif.) Bat., H.Maia & M.L.Farr (1962); Laeviomeliola Bat. (1960); Meliola subgen. Chaetomeliola Cif. (1938); Meliothecium Mussat (1901); Myxothecium Kunze 1829

= Meliola =

Genus of fungi

Meliola is a large genus of fungi in the family Meliolaceae. It was circumscribed by Swedish mycologist Elias Magnus Fries in 1825.

== Species ==
As of October 2022, Species Fungorum (in the Catalogue of Life) accepts 1701 species of Meliola, Outline of Fungi notes 1700 species. Species in the genus include:

- Meliola brevispora
- Meliola evansii
- Meliola mangiferae
- Meliola wainioi
- Meliola zangii

See also List of Meliola species
