= Meliola wainioi =

Scientific classification
- Domain: Eukaryota
- Kingdom: Fungi
- Division: Ascomycota
- Class: Sordariomycetes
- Order: Meliolales
- Family: Meliolaceae
- Genus: Meliola
- Species: M. wainioi

Binomial name
- Meliola wainioi Pat. (1890)

Species of fungus

Meliola wainioi is a fungus species described as new to science in 1890 by French mycologist Narcisse Théophile Patouillard. It is named in honour of Finnish lichenologist Edvard August Vainio, who found the type specimen growing on "tough leaves". The type locality is Minas Gerais, Brazil. The fungus grows as a dense, thick woolly black spot on the leaf surface. It produces relatively large ascospores measuring 65–70 by 22–25 μm, typically divided by 3 (sometimes 4) septa; the terminal two spore segments are smaller than the middle segments.
