= Paramoeba perurans =

- P. perurans attached form

Scientific classification
- Domain: Eukaryota
- Supergroup: Amorphea
- Phylum: Amoebozoa
- Class: Discosea
- Order: Dactylopodida
- Family: Paramoebidae
- Genus: Paramoeba
- Species: P. perurans

Binomial name
- Paramoeba perurans (Young et al., 2007) Feehan et al., 2013

Synonyms
- Neoparamoeba perurans Young et al., 2007

Species of amoeba

Paramoeba perurans is a species of marine amoeba in the family Paramoebidae. It is the causative agent of amoebic gill disease (AGD), an infectious disease that afflicts marine fish, particularly farmed salmon. The organism was originally described as Neoparamoeba perurans in 2007, before being transferred to the genus Paramoeba in 2013.

== Taxonomy and discovery ==
=== Taxonomy ===
Paramoeba perurans was formally described in 2007 as Neoparamoeba perurans. The genus Neoparamoeba was initially differentiated from Paramoeba by the absence of microscopic scale-like structures (microscales) on the cell surface.

In 2013, phylogenetic analysis of small subunit ribosomal DNA indicated that Paramoeba and Neoparamoeba could not be distinguished as separate evolutionary lineages. The researchers proposed combining the genera, establishing the name Paramoeba perurans.

=== Discovery ===
Amoebic gill disease was recognized in farmed fish before the causative agent was conclusively identified. Two closely related amoeba, Neoparamoeba pemaquidensis and Neoparamoeba branchiophila had been cultured from fish with amoebic gill disease and were believed to be possible etiologic agents. However, experimental infection of fish with clonal cultures from these two species of amoeba failed to produce amoebic gill disease pathology.

In 2007, researchers compared cultured amoeba isolates with amoeba collected directly from infected gills and noticed inconsistent amplification using species specific PCR primers. Subsequent sequencing of the 18S and 28S rRNA genes indicated the presence of a previously unidentified species of amoeba, distinct from N. pemaquidensis and P. branchiophila.

After its initial discovery, P. perurans remained difficult to study due to the lack of effective isolation and culture methods. In 2012, Crosbie et al. successfully isolated and cultured P. perurans and demonstrated that it could cause amoebic gill disease in healthy Atlantic salmon. The organism was subsequently recovered from the experimentally infected fish, fulfilling Koch's postulates.

== Biology ==
=== Morphology ===
Paramoeba perurans showing an enlarged parasome (arrow)

Paramoeba perurans is a unicellular amoeba that demonstrates significant variation in morphology. The morphology of P. perurans also differs depending on whether the amoeba is attached to a surface or suspended in the surrounding liquid.

=== Endosymbiosis ===
P. perurans contains a distinctive intracellular endosymbiont known as a parasome. Located near the nucleus, the parasome is a separate eukaryotic organism closely related to kinetoplastids and is commonly referred to as a Perkinsela-like organism (PLO).

Genetic studies of Paramoeba and their endosymbionts suggest they have co-evolved over time. The endosymbionts are thought to be vertically transmitted from parent amoebae to daughter cells during cell division.

== Pathogenicity ==
Paramoeba perurans infects gills of marine fish, resulting in a disease known as amoebic gill disease. Infection results in epithelial hyperplasia and fusion of gill lamellae, resulting in decreased oxygen exchange. Mucus production may also be increased.
