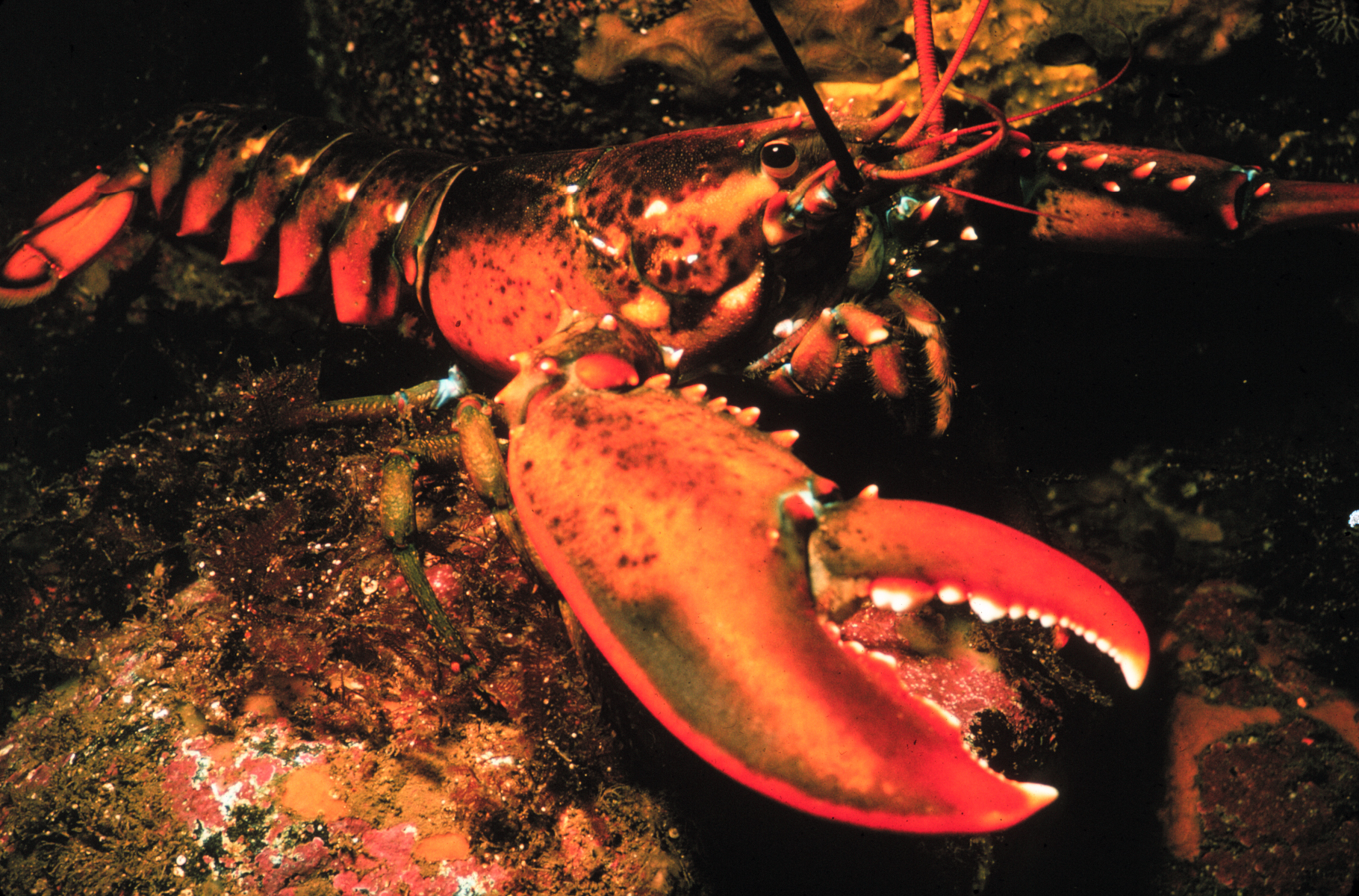

Conservation status
- Least Concern (IUCN 3.1)

Scientific classification
- Kingdom: Animalia
- Phylum: Arthropoda
- Clade: Pancrustacea
- Class: Malacostraca
- Order: Decapoda
- Suborder: Pleocyemata
- Family: Nephropidae
- Genus: Homarus
- Species: H. americanus

Binomial name
- Homarus americanus H. Milne-Edwards, 1837
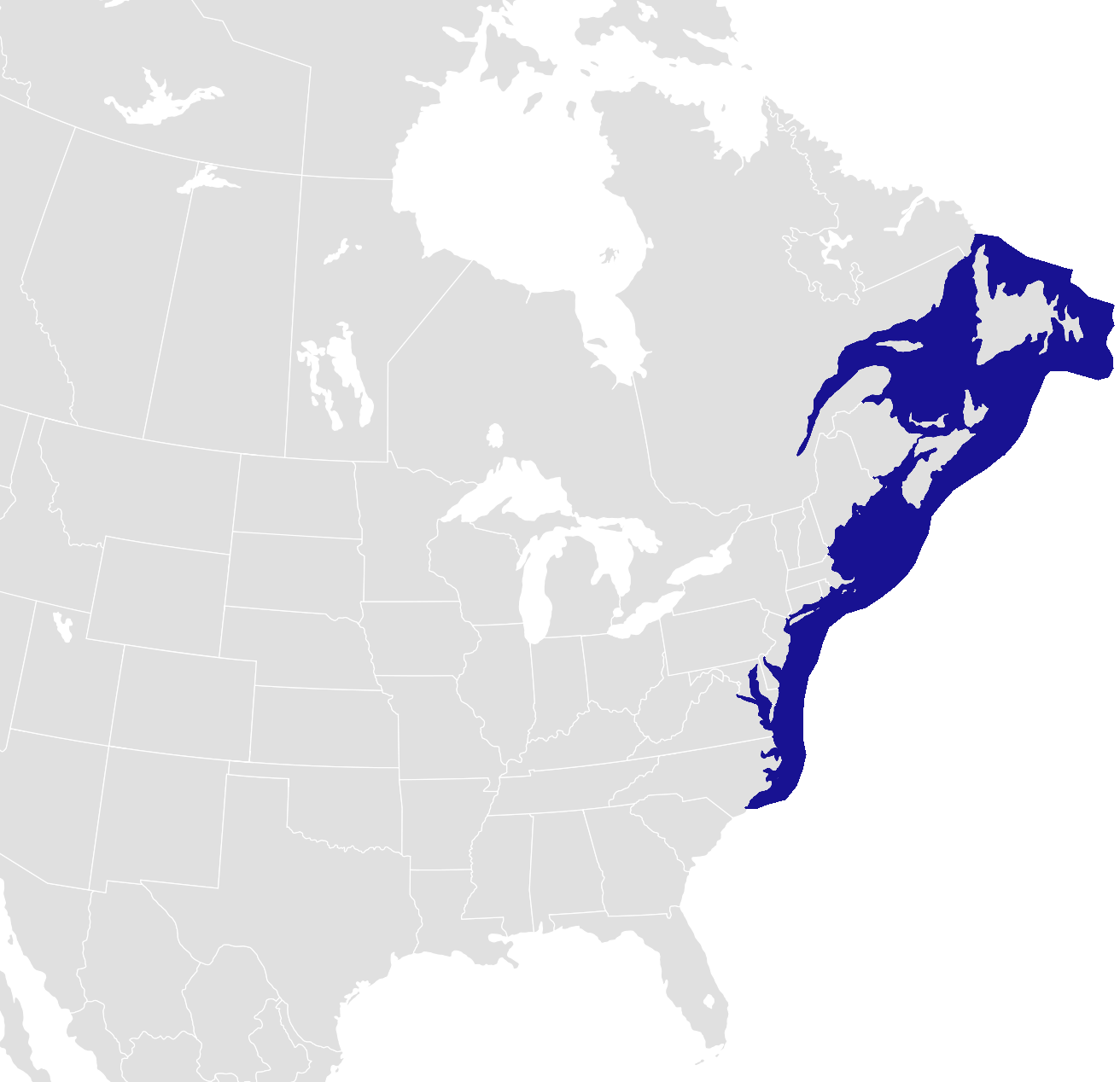
- Natural range of H. americanus (blue)

Synonyms
- Astacus marinus Say, 1817 (non Fabricius, 1775); Astacus americanus Stebbing, 1893; Homarus mainensis Berrill, 1956

= American lobster =

American lobster Temporal range: Pleistocene–Recent

Lobster of the western North Atlantic

The American lobster (Homarus americanus) is a species of lobster found on the Atlantic coast of North America, chiefly from Labrador to New Jersey. It is also known as Atlantic lobster, Canadian lobster, northern lobster, Canadian Reds, or Maine lobster. It is sometimes called the true lobster or common lobster, but those names are ambiguous. It can reach a body length of 64 cm (25 in), and a mass of over 20 kilograms (44 lb), making it not only the heaviest crustacean in the world, but also the heaviest of all living arthropod species. Its closest relative is the European lobster Homarus gammarus, which can be distinguished by its coloration and the lack of spines on the underside of the rostrum. American lobsters are usually bluish green to brown with red spines, but several color variations have been observed.

== Distribution ==
Homarus americanus is distributed along the Atlantic coast of North America, from Labrador in the north to Cape Hatteras, North Carolina, in the south. South of New Jersey, the species is uncommon, and landings in Delaware, Maryland, Virginia and North Carolina usually make up less than 0.1% of all landings. A fossil claw assigned to Homarus americanus was found at Nantucket, dating from the Pleistocene. In 2013, an American lobster was caught at the Farallon Islands off the coast of California. It has been introduced to Norway and potentially Iceland.

== Description ==
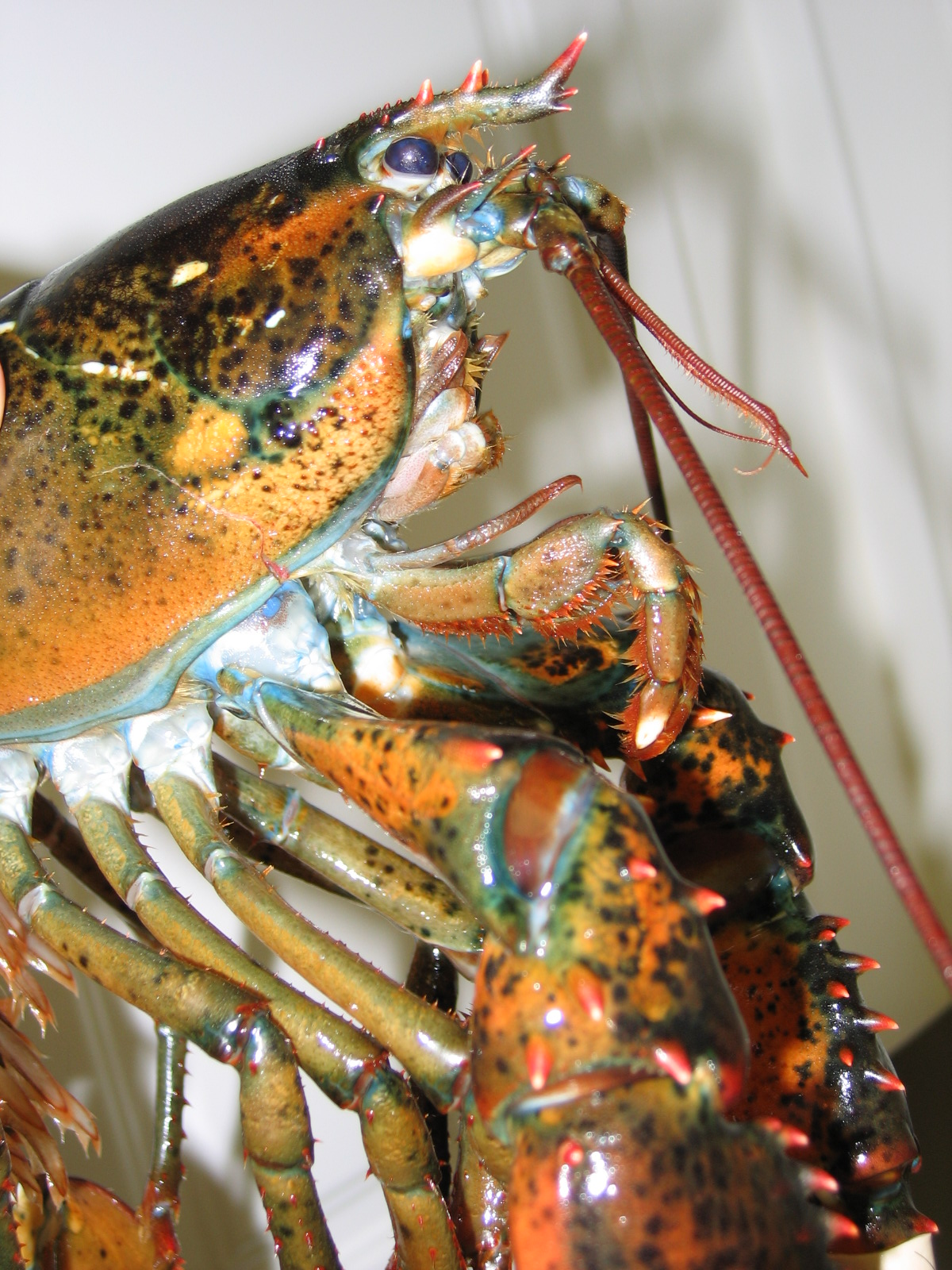
Profile of the anterior part of an American lobster

Homarus americanus commonly reaches 200–610 millimetres (8–24 in) long and weighs 0.45–4.08 kilograms (1–9 lb) in weight, but has been known to weigh as much as 20 kg (44 lb), making this the heaviest crustacean in the world. Together with Sagmariasus verreauxi, it is also the longest decapod crustacean in the world; an average adult is about 230 mm (9 in) long and weighs 680 to 910 g (1.5 to 2 lb). The longest American lobsters have a body (excluding claws) 64 cm (25 in) long. According to Guinness World Records, the heaviest crustacean ever recorded was an American lobster caught off Nova Scotia, Canada, weighing 20.1 kg (44.4 lb).

The closest relative of H. americanus is the European lobster, Homarus gammarus. The two species are very similar, and can be crossed artificially, although hybrids are unlikely to occur in the wild since their ranges do not overlap. The two species can be distinguished by several characteristics:

- The rostrum of H. americanus bears one or more spines on the underside, which are lacking in H. gammarus.
- The spines on the claws of H. americanus are red or red-tipped, while those of H. gammarus are white or white-tipped.
- The underside of the claw of H. americanus is orange or red, while that of H. gammarus is creamy white or very pale red.

=== Head ===
The antennae measure about 51 mm (2 in) long and split into Y-shaped structures with pointed tips. Each tip exhibits a dense zone of hair tufts staggered in a zigzag arrangement. These hairs are covered with multiple nerve cells that can detect odors. Larger, thicker hairs found along the edges control the flow of water, containing odor molecules, to the inner sensory hairs. The shorter antennules provide a further sense of smell. By having a pair of olfactory organs, a lobster can locate the direction a smell comes from, much the same way humans can hear the direction a sound comes from. In addition to sensing smells, the antennules can judge water speed to improve direction finding.

Lobsters have two urinary bladders, located on either side of the head. Lobsters use scents to communicate what and where they are, and those scents are in the urine. They project long plumes of urine 1–2 meters (3 ft 3 in – 6 ft 7 in) in front of them, and do so when they detect a rival or a potential mate in the area.

=== Thorax ===
The first pair of pereiopods (legs) is armed with a large, asymmetric pair of claws. The larger one is the "crusher", and has rounded nodules used for crushing prey; the other is the "cutter" or "gripper", which has sharp inner edges and is used for holding or tearing the prey. Whether the crusher claw is on the left side or right side of its body determines whether a lobster is left or right "handed".

=== Coloration ===
The normal coloration of Homarus americanus is bluish green to brown with red spines due to a mixture of yellow, blue, and red pigments that occur naturally in the shell. On rare occasions these colors are distorted due to genetic mutations or conditions creating a spectacle for those who catch them. In 2012 it was reported that there has been an increase in these "rare" catches due to unclear reasons. Social media influence making reporting and sharing more accessible to a drop in predator populations have been suggested as possible reasons. The lobsters mentioned below usually receive media coverage due to their rarity and eye appeal.

Color	Image	Rarity	Description
Blue		1 in 2 million	Some lobsters become blue as a result of a genetic mutation that causes the lobster to produce an excessive amount of a particular protein. The protein and a red carotenoid molecule known as astaxanthin combine to form a blue complex known as crustacyanin, giving the lobster its blue color. While an estimated 1 in 2 million lobsters are blue, they may not be as rare as they are portrayed given how many lobsters are caught in a given year. David Spiegelhalter from the University of Cambridge pointed out that a rough analysis shows that 200 million lobsters are caught in the North Atlantic every year. He stated that if the odds are correct then it would mean 100 of them would be blue. Spiegelhalter concluded that the catches are not all that surprising, and that these lobsters probably turn up most years. In any case, when blue lobsters are caught they are either released back into the sea or placed in local aquariums.
Red (live)		1 in 10 million	Red lobster coloration is the typical result of cooking, which is caused by the chemical astaxanthin reacting with boiling water. The estimated odds of catching a live red lobster are 1 in 10 million. Director Bob Bayer from the Lobster Institute at the University of Maine stated in 2016 that "the genetics of red lobsters are not as well understood" when compared to blue lobsters.
Yellow or orange		1 in 30 million	Yellow lobsters are the result of an unspecified rare genetic mutation, while orange lobsters are caused by a lack of proteins which help to bond the different pigments. Most orange lobsters are described as "calico", with a mixture of orange and black colors present. Yellow and orange lobsters are typically placed into aquariums, as predators can easily spot them if they are released back into the wild. The odds of catching a yellow lobster stand at 1 in 30 million.
Split		1 in 50 million	Several lobsters have been caught that show a different color on the left and right side of the body. According to a researcher at the University of Rhode Island, this split colorization is the result of a genetic condition which causes both sides of the lobster to develop independently. Split-colored lobsters often show sexual characteristics of both sexes, with exceptions. The chance of finding a split-colored lobster is estimated at 1 in 50 million.
Iridescent or white (albino)		1 in 100 million	It is estimated that 1 in 100 million lobsters are albino, entirely lacking in colored pigments. "White" lobsters that still have trace colors present in the shell are similarly rare; these are not categorized as albino but rather as leucistic. Neither of these genetic conditions are unique to lobsters.

Range of colorations

Lobsters with atypical coloring are extremely rare, accounting for only a few of the millions caught every year, and due to their rarity, they usually are not eaten, instead being released back into the wild or donated to aquariums. Often, in cases of atypical coloring, there is a genetic factor, such as albinism or hermaphroditism. Special coloring does not appear to affect the lobster's taste once cooked; except for albinos, all lobsters possess astaxanthin, which is responsible for the bright red color lobsters turn after being cooked.

Atypical Coloring in Lobsters
Color	Prevalence	Notes	Notable specimens
Albino	1 in 100,000,000	Also called white; translucent; ghost; crystal.	
"Cotton Candy"	1 in 100,000,000	Also called pastel. Possibly a sub-type of albino.	Haddie (2021, Maine)
Blue	1 in 1,000,000 to 1 in 2,000,000	Caused by a genetic defect.	Lord Stanley (2019, Massachusetts)(2019, St. Louis) Lucky Blue (2022, Maine)
Calico	1 in 30,000,000		Eve (2019, Maryland)
Orange	1 in 30,000,000		Cheddar (2022, Florida), Biscuit (2022, Mississippi), Jean-Clawed Van Damme (2025, New York)
Split-colored	1 in 50,000,000	Almost all split-coloreds are hermaphroditic.	
"Halloween"	1 in 50,000,000 to 1 in 100,000,000	Sub-type of split-colored, specifically orange and black.	Pinchy (2012, Massachusetts)
Red	1 in 10,000,000 to 1 in 30,000,000		
Yellow	1 in 30,000,000		

== Life cycle ==
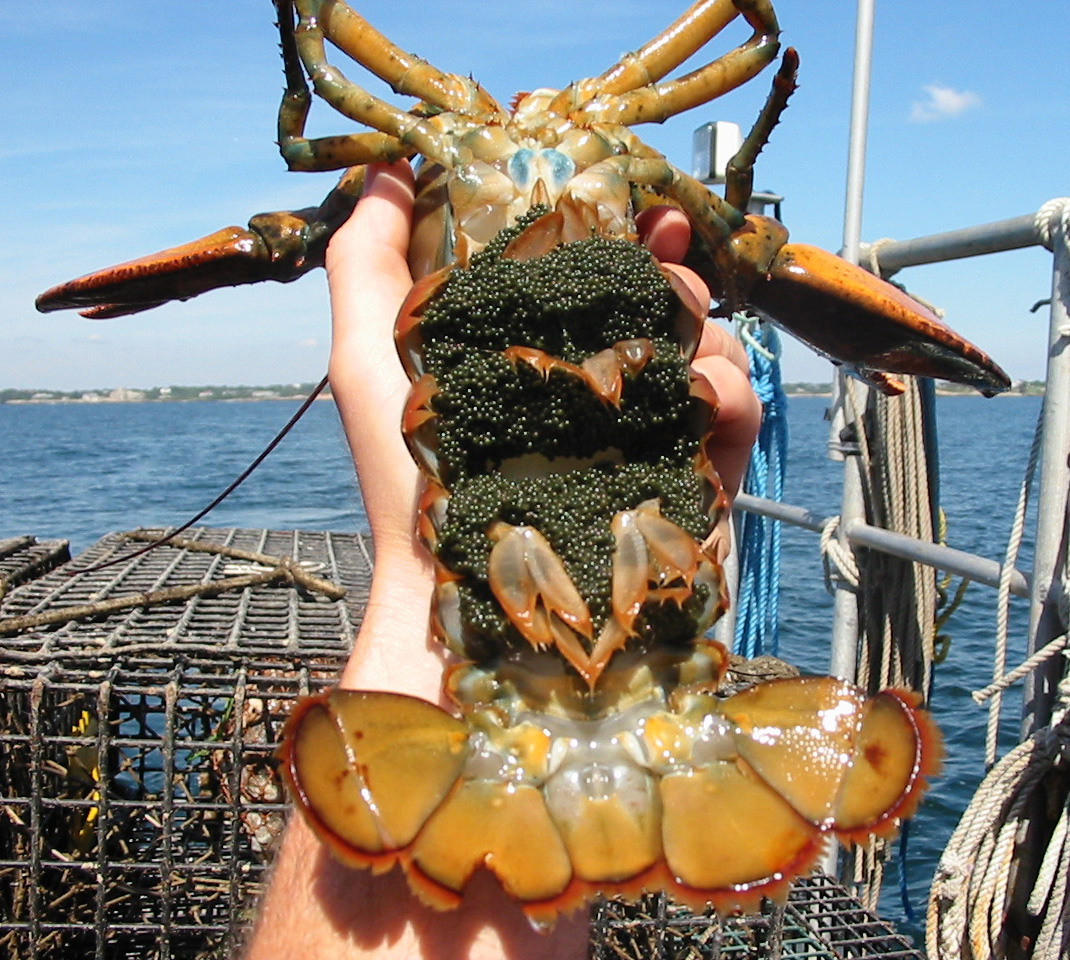
A female lobster carrying eggs on her pleopods. The tail flipper second from left has been notched by researchers to indicate she is an active breeding female.

Mating only takes place shortly after the female has molted and her exoskeleton is still soft. The female releases a pheromone which causes the males to become less aggressive and to begin courtship, which involves a courtship dance with claws closed. Eventually, the male inserts spermatophores (sperm packets) into the female's seminal receptacle using his first pleopods; the female may store the sperm for up to 15 months.

The female releases eggs through her oviducts, and they pass the seminal receptacle and are fertilized by the stored sperm. They are then attached to the female's pleopods (swimmerets) using an adhesive, where they are cared for until they are ready to hatch. The female cleans the eggs regularly and fans them with water to keep them oxygenated. The large telolecithal eggs may resemble the segments of a raspberry, and a female carrying eggs is said to be "in berry". Since this period lasts 10–11 months, berried females can be found at any time of year. In the waters off New England, the eggs are typically laid in July or August, and hatch the following May or June. The developing embryo passes through several molts within the egg, before hatching as a metanauplius larva. When the eggs hatch, the female releases them by waving her tail in the water, setting batches of larvae free.

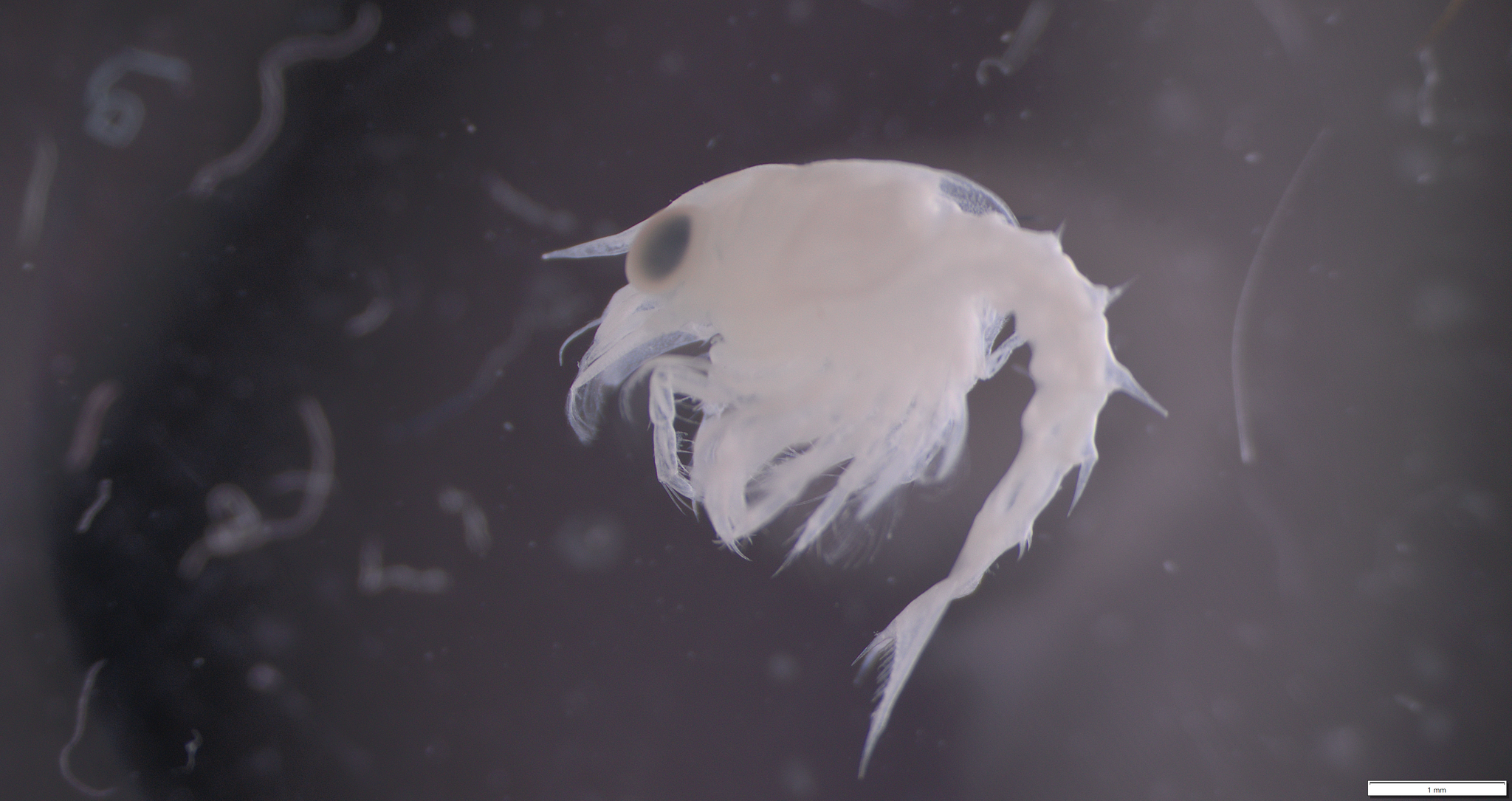
Zoea of Homarus americanus

The metanauplius of H. americanus is 8.5 mm (1/3 in) long, transparent, with large eyes and a long spine projecting from its head. It quickly molts, and the next three stages are similar, but larger. These molts take 10–20 days, during which the planktonic larvae are vulnerable to predation; only 1 in 1,000 is thought to survive to the juvenile stage. To reach the fourth stage – the post-larva – the larva undergoes metamorphosis, and subsequently shows a much greater resemblance to the adult lobster, is around 13 mm (1/2 in) long, and swims with its pleopods. At this stage, the lobster's claws are still relatively small so they rely primarily on tail-flip escapes if threatened.

After the next molt, the lobster sinks to the ocean floor and adopts a benthic lifestyle. It molts more and more infrequently, from an initial rate of ten times per year to once every few years. After one year it is around 25–38 mm (1–1.5 in) long, and after six years it may weigh 0.45 kilograms (1 lb). By the time it reaches the minimum landing size, an individual may have molted 25–27 times, and thereafter each molt may signal a 40%–50% increase in weight, and a 14% increase in carapace length. If threatened, adult lobsters will generally choose to fight unless they have lost their claws.

== Ecology ==
The American lobster thrives in cold, shallow waters where there are many rocks and other places to hide from predators. It typically lives at a depth of 4–50 m (13–164 ft), but can be found up to 480 m (1,570 ft) below the surface.

=== Diet ===
The natural diet of H. americanus is relatively consistent across different habitats. It is dominated by mollusks (especially mussels, clams and snails), echinoderms and polychaetes, although a wide range of other prey items may be eaten, including other crustaceans (such as crabs), brittle stars, cnidarians and small fish. It will also feed on dead animals, as well as algae and eelgrass. Since lobsters sometimes eat their own molted shell, they were thought to be cannibalistic, but this has never been recorded in the wild. Lobsters in Maine have been shown to gain 35–55% of their calories from herring, which is used as bait for lobster traps. Only 6% of lobsters entering lobster traps to feed are caught.

=== Diseases ===
==== Bacterial ====
Gaffkaemia or red-tail is an extremely virulent infectious disease of lobsters caused by the bacterium Aerococcus viridans. It only requires a few bacterial cells to cause death of otherwise healthy lobsters. The "red tail" common name refers to a dark orange discoloration of the ventral abdomen of affected lobsters. This is, in fact, the hemolymph or blood seen through the thin ventral arthrodial membranes. The red discoloration comes from astaxanthin, a carotenoid pigment exported to the blood during times of stress. The same sign is also seen in other diseases of lobsters and appears to be a nonspecific stress response, possibly relating to the antioxidant and immunostimulatory properties of the astaxanthin molecule.

Epizootic shell disease is a bacterial infection which causes black lesions on the lobsters' dorsal carapaces, reducing their saleability and sometimes killing the lobsters.

Limp lobster disease caused by systemic infection by the bacterium Vibrio fluvialis (or similar species) causes lobsters to become lethargic and die.

==== Parasitic ====
Paramoebiasis is an infectious disease of lobsters caused by infection with the sarcomastigophoran (amoeba) Neoparamoeba pemaquidensis. This organism also causes amoebic gill disease in farmed Atlantic salmon, Salmo salar. Infection occurs throughout the tissues, causing granuloma-like lesions, especially within the ventral nerve cord, the interstices of the hepatopancreas and the antennal gland. Paramoebiasis is strongly suspected to play a prominent role in the rapid die-off of American lobsters in Long Island Sound that occurred in the summer of 1999.

==== Environmental ====
Excretory calcinosis in American lobsters in Long Island Sound was described in 2002. The disease causes mineralized calculi to form in the antennal glands and gills. These cause a loss of surface area around the gills, and the lobster eventually asphyxiates. Several reasons have been proposed for the cause of a recent outbreak of the disease. The most generally attributed factor is an increased duration of warmer temperatures in the bottom of the Long Island Sound.

Plastic pollution is harmful for American lobsters. Consumption of microplastic particles may be deadly to early-stage larvae. For later stage larvae, oxygen consumption rate decreases with high level of microplastic fibers.

== Taxonomy ==
The American lobster was first described by Thomas Say in 1817, with a type locality of "Long-branch, part of the coast of New Jersey". The name Say chose – "Astacus marinus" – was invalid as a junior homonym of Astacus marinus Fabricius, 1775, which is in turn a junior synonym of Homarus gammarus. The American lobster was given its current scientific name of Homarus americanus by Henri Milne-Edwards in his 1837 work Histoire naturelle des Crustacés ("Natural History of the Crustacea"). The common name preferred by the Food and Agriculture Organization is "American lobster", but the species is also known locally as the "northern lobster", "Maine lobster" or simply "lobster".

== As food ==
Global capture production of American lobster (Homarus americanus) in thousand tonnes from 1950 to 2022, as reported by the FAO

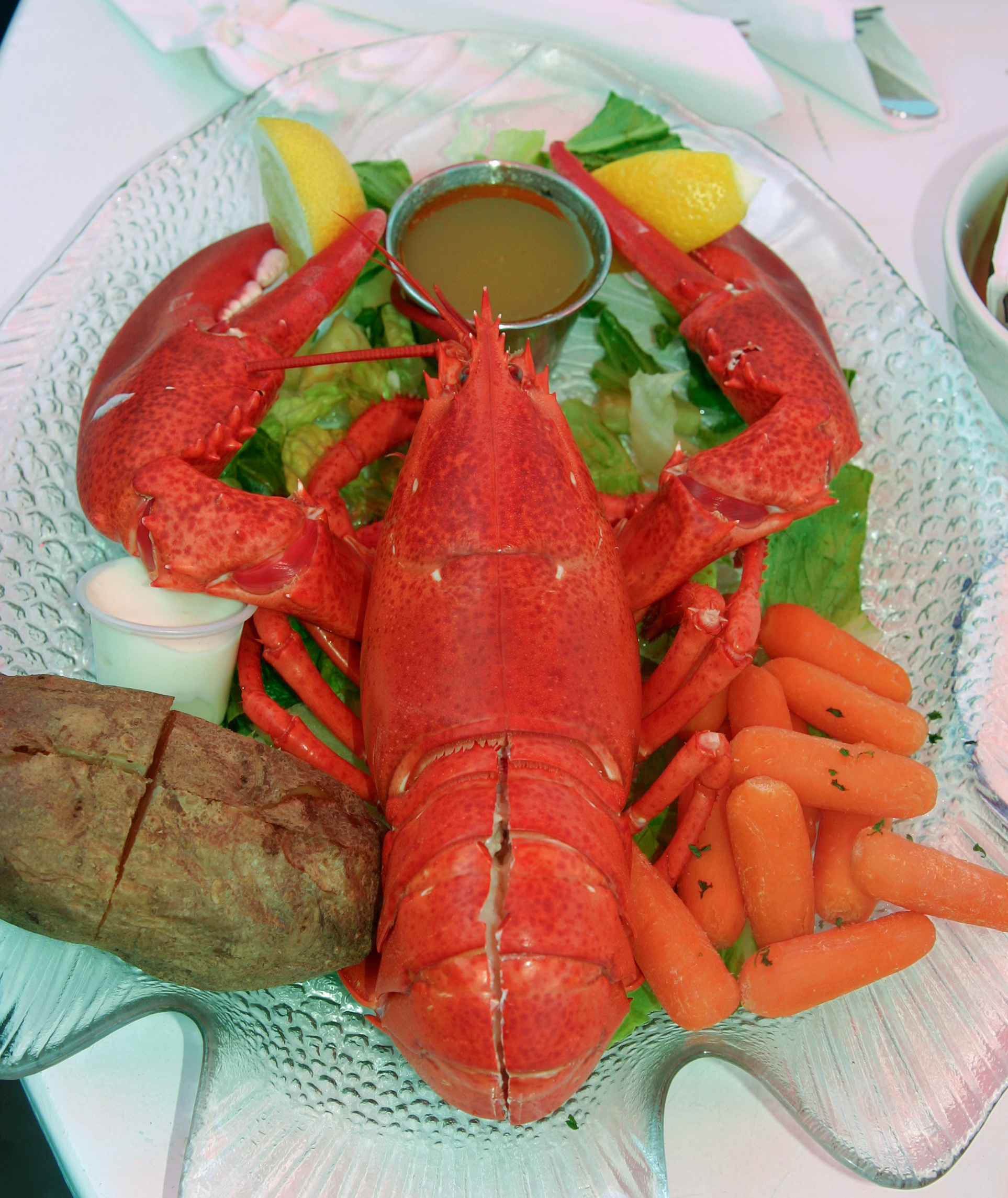
A cooked lobster

American lobsters are a popular food. They are commonly boiled or steamed. Hard-shells (lobsters that are several months past their last molt) can survive out of water for up to four or five days if kept refrigerated. Soft-shells (lobsters that have only recently molted) do not survive more than a few hours out of water. Lobsters are usually cooked alive, which may be illegal in certain areas and which some people consider inhumane.

Boiling lobsters has been banned in several jurisdictions, including Switzerland, New Zealand, and parts of Italy. Boiling has been deemed to cause "extreme suffering" in lobsters, who continue to show intense brain activity for 30 to 150 seconds after immersion in boiling water. Slowly raising the water temperature may also cause pain in crustaceans over a longer period of time.

Lobster 'tail' (actually the abdomen) is sometimes served with beef as surf and turf. Lobsters have a greenish or brownish organ called the tomalley, which, like the liver and pancreas in a human, filters out toxins from the body. Some diners consider it a delicacy, but others avoid it because they consider it a toxin source, dislike eating innards, or are put off by its grainy paste texture and greenish appearance.

A set of nutcrackers and a long, thin tool for pulling meat from inaccessible areas are suggested as basics, although more experienced diners can eat the animal with their bare hands or a simple tool (a fork, knife or rock). Eating a lobster can get messy, and most restaurants offer a lobster bib. Meat is generally contained in the larger claws and tails, and stays warm quite a while after being served. There is some meat in the legs and in the arms that connect the large claws to the body. There is also some small amount of meat just below the carapace around the thorax and in the smaller legs.

=== Recognition of the sentience of North American lobsters ===
A 2021 London School of Economics report found strong evidence to suggest that lobsters can experience pain. Dr Jonathan Birch, Principal Investigator on the project, said, "After reviewing over 300 scientific studies, we concluded that cephalopod molluscs and decapod crustaceans should be regarded as sentient, and should therefore be included within the scope of animal welfare law."

Following the report, octopuses, crabs and lobsters are now protected under stronger animal welfare legislation in the UK (under the Animal Welfare (Sentience) Bill).

=== North American lobster industry ===
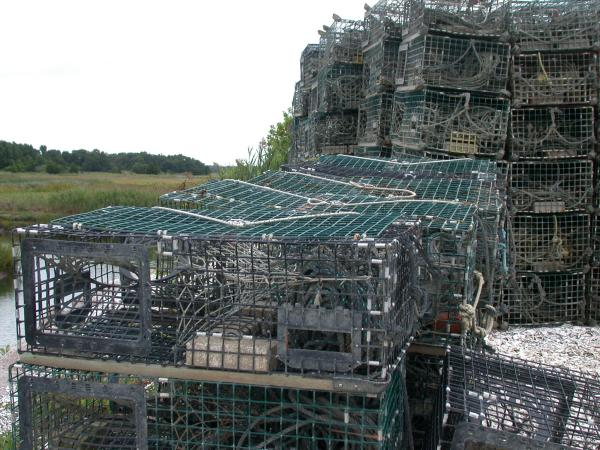
Lobster traps on Long Island Sound near Guilford, Connecticut

Most lobsters come from the northeastern coast of North America, with the Atlantic Provinces of Canada and the U.S. state of Maine being the largest producers. They are caught primarily using lobster traps, although lobsters are also harvested as bycatch by bottom trawlers, fishermen using gillnets, and by scuba divers in some areas. Maine prohibits scuba divers from catching lobsters; violations are punishable by fines of up to $1000. Maine also prohibits the landing of lobsters caught by bottom trawlers and other "mobile gear". Massachusetts offers scuba divers lobster licenses for a fee, and they are only available to state residents. Rhode Island also requires divers to acquire a permit.

Lobster traps are rectangular cages made of vinyl-coated galvanized steel mesh or wood, with woven mesh entrances. These are baited and lowered to the sea floor. They allow a lobster to enter, but make it difficult for the larger specimens to turn around and exit. This allows the creatures to be captured alive. The traps, sometimes referred to as "pots", have a buoy floating on the surface, and lobstermen check their traps between one and seven days after setting them. The inefficiency of the trapping system has inadvertently prevented the lobster population from being overfished. Lobsters can easily escape the trap, and will defend the trap against other lobsters because it is a source of food. An estimated 10% of lobsters that encounter a trap enter, and of those that enter 6% will be caught.

==== United States ====
In the United States, the lobster industry is regulated. Every lobster fisher is required to use a lobster gauge to measure the distance from the lobster's eye socket to the end of its carapace: if the lobster is less than 3.25 inches (83 mm) long, it is too young to be sold and must be released back to the sea. There is also a legal maximum size of 5 in (130 mm) in Maine, meant to ensure the survival of a healthy breeding stock of adult males, but in parts of some states, such as Massachusetts, there is none. Also, traps must contain an escape hole or "vent", which allows juvenile lobsters and bycatch species to escape. The law in Maine and other states dictates a second large escape hole or "ghost panel" must be installed. This hole is held shut through use of degradable clips made of ferrous metal. Should the trap become lost, the trap eventually opens, allowing the catch to escape.

To protect known breeding females, lobsters caught carrying eggs are to be notched on a tail flipper (second from the right, if the lobster is right-side up and the tail is fully extended). Following this, the female cannot be kept or sold, and is commonly referred to as a "punch-tail" or as "v-notched". This notch remains for two molts of the lobster exoskeleton, providing harvest protection and continued breeding availability for up to five years.

==== Canada ====
In Canada, the Department of Fisheries and Oceans is responsible for the governance of fisheries under the authority of the Fisheries Act. The governance structure also includes various other acts, regulations, orders and policies. American lobster is fished in Canada by lobster licence holders hailing from ports located in provinces on Canada's east coast. Lobster is Canada's most valuable seafood export, worth over CAD$2 billion in 2016.

=== Management ===
American lobster tends to have a stable stock in colder northern waters, but gradually decreases in abundance moving southward. To manage lobster populations, more regulations and restrictions, geared towards achieving sustainable populations, are implemented gradually southward.

== Genetics ==
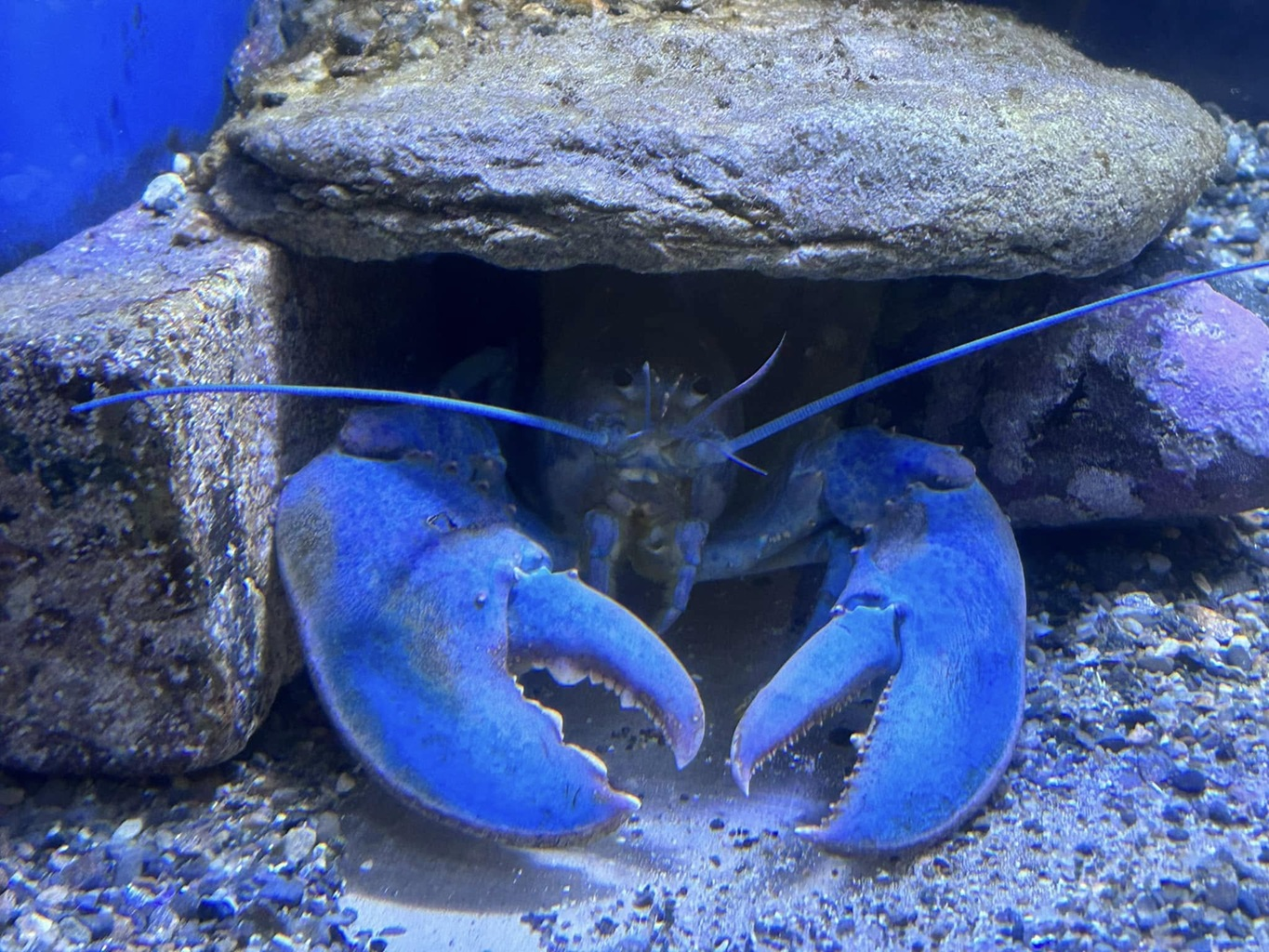
One in a million rare blue lobster, Seacoast Science Center Rye NH 2024

Currently there is no published genome for the American lobster, although a transcriptome was published in 2016.
