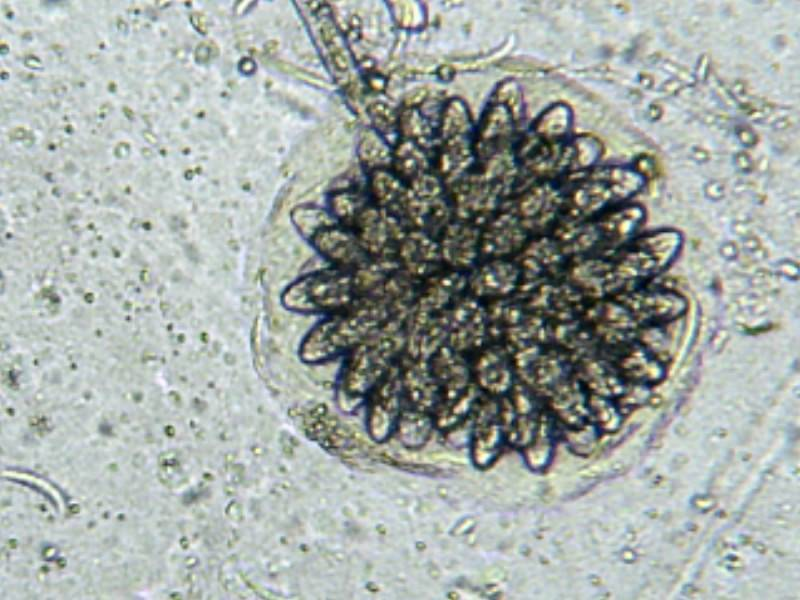

Scientific classification
- Domain: Eukaryota
- Kingdom: Fungi
- Division: Zoopagomycota
- Class: Zoopagomycetes
- Order: Zoopagales
- Family: Helicocephalidaceae
- Genus: Rhopalomyces
- Species: R. elegans

Binomial name
- Rhopalomyces elegans Corda (1839)

Synonyms
- Haplotrichum elegans (Corda) Harz (1872)

= Rhopalomyces elegans =

Species of fungus

Rhopalomyces elegans is a common species of zygomycete fungus, and the type species of the genus Rhopalomyces. Widely distributed, it is found in soil, rotting plant material, and animal dung. It is a facultative parasite of nematode eggs.

== Taxonomy ==
The species was first recorded by August Carl Joseph Corda, who isolated it from material collected from a Prague greenhouse. In 1962, Ellis and Hesseltine demonstrated a method to grow the species in pure culture by using a growth medium containing calf's liver and lamb fat. A year later, Ellis recognized four varieties of Rhopalomyces elegans, defined by their growth in different media: minor, crassus, apiculatus, and the nominate variety elegans.

== Description ==
When grown in pure culture conditions on a petri dish at a temperature of 25 °C (77 °F), Rhopalomyces elegans produces hyaline (translucent), partially submerged colonies that fill the plate in about six days. The fungus produces large, dark brown conidiospores borne on a swollen vesicle at the end of a conidiophore. The vesicles measure 40–63 μm in diameter. The hyphae are very thin, measuring only 2 μm in diameter.

Rhopalomyces magnus is similar in morphology, but only attacks eggs of rotifers.

== Ecology ==
A common species, R. elegans is found in rotting plant material and animal debris, as well as dung associated with soil. The fungus is a parasite of nematode eggs. When it encounters an egg, it produces hyphae that form a structure on the egg surface similar to an appressorium. This structure produces a narrow infection tube that penetrates the egg shell. Once inside, fungal hyphae proliferate by branching and expanding, eventually filling the interior of the egg and absorbing the nutrients within. R. elegans may be able to attack the larval and adult stages of some nematode species.

Rhopalomyces elegans can itself be parasitized by the fungi Mycogone perniciosa and Verticillium psalliotae. Verticillium psalliotae is a saprobic soil-dwelling fungus that is a parasite of the common commercially grown button mushroom (Agaricus bisporus). R. elegans may serve as a reservoir for the pathogen, and may harbor the parasite in its thick cell walls.
