= Stylopage =

Scientific classification
- Kingdom: Fungi
- Division: Zoopagomycota
- Class: Zoopagomycetes
- Order: Zoopagales
- Family: Zoopagaceae
- Genus: Stylopage; Drechsler (1935)

Species
- See text

Genus of fungi

Stylopage is a polytypic genus of predacious fungus in the order Zoopagales, within the subphylum Zoopagomycotina. All known species of Stylopage subsist on various species of amoebae or nematodes by trapping their prey, typically using an adhesive substance that coats their vegetative hyphae, and absorbing nutrients through the projection of a haustorium. 17 extant Stylopage species have been described thus far.

== History and taxonomy ==
Stylopage was first described in 1935 by Charles Drechsler, with the discovery and growth of three new species – S. haploe, S. araea, and S. lepte – on media that had been grown from decaying vegetable matter found in temperate woodlands near Washington, D.C. The genus name refers to the presence of conidia on long, rod-like fertile hyphae, as well as its predatory nature. Drechsler initially placed Stylopage within the now-defunct Phycomycetes. Upon discovery of further Stylopage species, Drechsler placed the genus within the newly created family, Zoopagaceae. Identification and description of further Stylopage species has largely been determined based on similarities in conidial morphology and observed predatory behaviour. Stylopage has been described as both a predator and an obligate parasite. Regardless, all known species of Stylopage exhibit predatory behaviour towards either amoebae or nematodes.

Upon the reclassification of orders formerly belonging to Zygomycota, including Zoopagaceae, Stylopage and all other Zoopagales were placed within the subphylum Zoopagomycotina, under the new phylum Zoopagomycota. The Zoopagales have since been proven as a monophyletic order; within the Zoopagales, Stylopage forms a sister clade with Acaulopage, another predatory amoebophagous fungus.

However, more recent phylogenetic tree reconstructions based on 18S rRNA phylogeny contend that Stylopage itself is not monophyletic, and that S. hadra forms a sister clade with Zoophagus spp., suggesting that similarities in conidial morphology are not enough to determine monophyly within Stylopage. These phylogenetic analyses also indicated that S. hadra conidia incorporate a bacterial endosymbiont also associated with Acaulopage tetraceros.

== Geographical distribution and habitat ==
Stylopage generally thrives in temperate, moist soils or decaying vegetation beds in temperate Northern Hemisphere regions. Since the discovery of the type specimens, multiple Stylopage species have been grown from soils across Eastern North America. Stylopage growth has been found as far west as Colorado, as far north as Michigan and Southern Ontario, and as far south as Florida.

In addition, Stylopage can be found across Europe, with samples of multiple species collected from the United Kingdom, Ireland, and Germany. S. rhabdospora has also been cultured from samples obtained from the banks of the Sakawa River, in Japan. Drechsler initially reported that temperate, wet climates seem to promote the most growth of Stylopage species, and that North American summer temperatures were not conducive to its growth. Most samples of both nematophagous and amoebophagous species have been obtained from temperate riverbanks and forest floors, replete with rotting vegetation. More common species such as S. hadra and S. araea can be found ubiquitously in temperate Northern hemisphere leaf litter.

Multiple Stylopage species have been reported from farmlands and agricultural soils in more tropical countries, albeit in areas and conditions with comparatively cooler climates. S. hadra, one of the most common nematophagous species, has been found in both Hawaii and India. S. leiohypha has also been found in India. Multiple Stylopage species have been reported from temperate mountain forest floors in Kenya. Interestingly, there is evidence that S. hadra can grow in agricultural soils with moderate levels (up to 1.8 mmol) of lead contamination.

Animal dung has also been a highly fruitful area for Stylopage culture sources. S. anomala, S. cymosa, S. grandis, S. leiohypha, and S. hadra can all be found on horse or sheep dung sourced from temperate farmlands in the United Kingdom and Ireland. S. grandis has also been found on sheep dung from temperate Argentinian farming areas.

== Morphology and growth ==
Stylopage is characterized by sparsely-growing, dichotomously branching, aseptate vegetative hyphae. The genus is also distinguished from morphologically similar genera, such as Acaulopage, by its production of aseptate conidia on long, erect conidiophores. Vegetative hyphae are typically colourless or hyaline in appearance, although in some species, such as S. hadra, the adhesive substance used to constrain prey can cause the vegetative hyphae to appear golden-yellow under magnification. The size and shape of conidia, number of conidia per conidiophore, dimensions of hyphae, and presence or absence of zygospores all vary between species of Stylopage. Almost all species that produce multiple conidia per conidiophore do so successively - that is, after the production of one conidium, the conidiophore will branch out and continue elongating to produce another, often after previous conidia have detached.

Morphology of Stylopage species
Species	Nutrition	Vegetative hyphal morphology	Conidia & conidiophore morphology	Zygospore morphology
S. anomala	Amoebae up to 30 μm in diameter.	Hyaline, sparsely branched, 3.0-6.0 μm wide. Small (up to 5 μm) growths have been observed at points where amoebae have become attached to the mycelium, but these were not observed forming directly in response to their attachment.	Conidiophores hyaline, erect, 95-160 μm long, each producing up to 5 conidia. Conidia obovoid, 16-39 μm long and 6.0-14.5 μm wide. Conidia bear a round protuberance at their apical end filled with an adhesive substance; this substance often attaches two or more conidia together, and attaches the conidia to arthropods for the purpose of dispersal.	Zygospores unknown.
S. araea	Amoebae up to 50 μm in diameter.	Colourless, sparse, 0.8-1.3 μm wide.	Colourless, erect, comparatively slender and unbranched, 150-225 μm long, each bearing one conidium. Conidia drop-shaped with a pointed basal end and rounded apical end, 10-22 μm long and 5.4-7 μm wide. A variant (var. Magna) has been observed with conidia up to 37 μm long and up to 11 μm wide.	Zygospores are yellow with wart-like bumps, roughly 9-12 μm in diameter, in both the type variant and var. Magna.
S. cephalote	Amoebae 10-14 μm in diameter.	Colourless, sparse, 1.2-1.8 μm wide.	Conidiophores colourless, erect, 45-75 μm long, with a distinctive bristling formation where 4-9 conidia are borne radially from the end of each conidiophore; conidia cylindrical, rounded at the distal end and pointed at the base, 14-25 μm long and 1.8-2.5 μm wide.	Zygospores formed from the germ tube of a conidium and a mycelial hypha; zygospore 7-9 μm in diameter, yellowish, round at first but eventually gaining 10-20 visible wart-like bumps.
S. cymosa	Amoebae up to 25 μm in length.	Hyaline, sparingly branched, 1-2 μm in width.	Conidiophores erect, up to 150 μm in height, each bearing up to 8 conidia successively; conidia are hyaline and rectangular-ellipsoidal, 12-21 μm long, 6-10 μm wide.	Zygospores unknown.
S. grandis	Nematodes up to 0.5mm long (estimate).	Sparsely branched vegetative hyphae covered in a colourless adhesive, about 5 μm wide.	Conidiophores erect, 300-500 μm long, bearing a maximum of 2 conidia; conidia obovoid, largest conidia in the genus, at 27-61 μm long and 13-26 μm wide.	Zygospores unknown.
S. hadra	Nematodes up to 0.5mm long.	Colourless, sparsely branched, 3.5-5.5 μm wide. However, grows yellow-orange adhesive protuberances up to 15 μm wide upon contact with nematodes.	Conidiophores tapering, 200-400 μm long, 2.5 μm (at tip) to 4.5 μm (at base) wide, can bear up to 4 conidia successively; conidia obovoid, 20-45 μm long and 13-23 μm wide.	Zygospores unknown.
S. haploe	Amoebae up to 40 μm in diameter.	Colourless, sparsely branched, 1-1.7 μm wide.	Erect, tapering conidiophores, 25-40 μm long and 5.4-7 μm wide, each bearing a single conidium; conidia fusoid and rounded at ends, 15-25 μm long and 2.2-2.7 μm wide.	Zygospores up to 10 μm in diameter, covered in comparatively small wart-like bumps.
S. leiohypha	Nematodes up to 0.5mm long, from genera such as Rhabditis, Cephalobus, and Acrobeles.	Colourless, sparsely branched, 2-3 μm wide.	Conidiophores colourless, erect, 125-300 μm long, tapering (up to 3.5 μm wide at the base and up to 1.4 μm wide at the apical tip), and each producing up to 4 conidia successively. Conidia, colourless, drop-shaped, with a pointed basal end and rounded apical end, 20-35 μm long and 7-18 μm wide.	Zygospores unknown.
S. lepte	Amoebae 10-20 μm in diameter.	Colourless, sparsely branched, 0.6-1 μm wide.	Erect, colourless conidiophores, 25-100 μm long and 0.7-0.9 μm wide (uniform width), each bearing up to 6 conidia successively; conidia are drop-shaped, with one pointed and one rounded end, 12-19 μm long and 1.9.2-7 μm wide. Conidia can produce haustoria directly.	Zygospores 4.5-6.5 μm in diameter at maturity, colourless or yellowish, each covered with 10-15 noticeable wart-like bumps. Zygospores can form through lateral conjugation.
S. minutula	Amoebae 7-15 μm in diameter.	Sparse, threadlike, continuous vegetative hyphae, 0.6-0.9 μm wide; haustoria terminate after 2 bifurcations within the prey.	Erect conidiophores, 40-60 μm long, 0.6-0.9 μm wide, each producing a maximum of 2 conidia successively; conidia ellipsoidal, 7.5-9 μm long and 2.6-3 μm wide.	Zygospores unknown.
S. rhabdoides	Amoebae 50-100 μm in diameter.	Colourless, threadlike with coarse membranes, 1.4-3 μm wide; branching pedicellate haustoria that spread inside prey to a span of 5-18 μm.	Conidiophores simple, erect, colorless, 1.4-2 μm wide, and 20-50 μm long; conidia elongated and cylindrical with pointed ends, 25-57 μm long and 2.7-5.3 μm wide.	Zygospores yellow, round, and covered in wart-like projections, 8-10 μm in diameter, commonly arising from the union of a vegetative hypha and a conidial germ tube.
S. rhabdospora	Amoebae 30-50 μm in diameter.	Colourless, 1-1.8 μm wide, with comparatively fewer branches than other Stylopage species; haustoria can also be produced directly from conidia.	Conidiophores colourless, erect, and tapering, 20-100 μm high and 0.8-1.5 μm (at the base) to 0.6-1.2 μm (at the apical end) wide; conidia are cylindrical with one pointed end, 25-35 μm long and 2.2-2.8 μm wide, although Drechsler identified a separate strain that, while otherwise identical, produced conidia up to 52 μm in length and 3.2 μm in width.	Zygospores yellowish, 6.5-8.5 μm wide, covered in 10-20 wart-like protuberances. Zygospores can form through lateral conjugation.
S. rhicnacra	Amoebae 10-20 μm in diameter.	Colourless, sparsely branched, 0.9-1.3 μm wide.	Conidiophores colourless, erect, 140-175 μm long, suddenly widening at their end until a septum forms and this widening becomes the conidium; each conidiophore bears one conidium. Conidia fusiform (spindle-shaped), 17-27 μm long and 4.5-6.5 μm wide, with an apical tube-like "beak" appendage filled with white protoplasm that has often deflated and emptied by the time the conidia detach.	Zygospores unknown.
S. rhynchospora	Amoebae 5-30 μm in diameter.	Colourless, winding and sparse with few branches, 1-1.8 μm wide.	Conidiophores prostrate for a length of 5-20 μm then turn upwards and become erect for up to 220 μm, and taper, from up to 3.5 μm near the base to 0.7-0.8 μm at the apical end; each conidiophore bears one conidium. Conidia are colourless and ovoid, 29–40.5 μm long and 7-12 μm wide, with a small rod-like pedicel under 2 μm at the basal end and a distinctive round "beak" at the apical end. The beak, although often seen burst or emptied, is filled with a yellow adhesive fluid that often causes two conidia to join together. Secondary and tertiary conidia have also been seen - that is, single conidia that form directly from the erect germ tube of another conidium, after about 120 μm.	Zygospore yellowish, 7.5-9 μm in diameter, often fused with the wall of the zygosporangium, covered in large wart-like bumps, themselves up to 2 μm high. However, a strain from Kenya has been observed displaying zygospores up to 18 μm in diameter.
S. scoliospora	Amoebae 13-22 μm in diameter.	Colourless, distinctively winding and tortuous compared to other Stylopage species, 1-2 μm wide, producing branching pedicellate haustoria inside prey that terminate with 8-10 branches.	Conidiophores 0.8-1.6 μm wide and up to 500 μm long, observed as both prostrate (in samples grown taken from wet leaf litter) and erect (in culture grown on agar), each producing up to 75 conidia successively, with a sudden jagged bend at the point of attachment of each conidium; conidia hyaline, frail, and threadlike, often looking similar to regular hyphae, 20-32 μm long and 1.3-1.9 μm wide.	Zygospores unknown.

Due to its predaceous metabolism, Stylopage is dependent on the presence of other heterotrophs – most often, saprophytic nematodes or amoebae to thrive. As such, even the most well-studied species, such as S. hadra, cannot readily be grown on a pure, sterile culture without significant prior presence of saprophytic bacteria and fungi. Many Stylopage species can be grown in laboratory conditions, but a relatively permeable surface must be used as a substrate for the necessary saprophyte growth. For example, Drechsler reported that little to no Stylopage growth could be seen on relatively hard cornmeal agar in initial assays, due to the inability of organisms such as amoebae and nematodes to support themselves on the surface. More recent studies have found more success with growing Stylopage in culture on water agar or 2% cornmeal agar, inoculated with molds originating from rotting leaves or animal dung. In keeping with the preference of Stylopage for temperate habitats, the optimal isolation and growth temperature for Stylopage in culture seems to be room temperature, in cultures originating from both dung and leaf litter. As such, cultures of different Stylopage species have been successful between 20 and 28 °C. Depending on the species, growth of Stylopage vegetative hyphae can begin as quickly as 48 hours or as slowly as 2 weeks after initial inoculation of the substrate.

Arthropod dispersal has been identified as a possible major dispersal mechanism for at least one species of Stylopage. S. anomala conidia exhibit close association to both Sappinia pedata, an amoeba, and to the ventral head and lower leg regions of gamasid mites associated with moose dung. This is accomplished through adhesive material released from the beaked apex of each conidium. These mites are motile and also associate with species of beetles themselves, enabling the S. anomala conidia to gain a powerful dispersal mechanism. Aquatic dispersal has also been suggested as a mechanism of dispersal, and S. scoliospora shows noticeable adaptations to aquatic life, such as comparatively long, curved hyphae and the possibility of prostrate conidiophore development.

== Nutrition ==
Stylopage species typically capture prey in a similar fashion. First, amoeba or nematode makes contact with section of vegetative hyphae. The prey organism is then held in place, most often by an adhesive substance produced by the fungus at the point of contact. Once the prey organism has been immobilized, a haustorium produced by the fungus will penetrate its cell membrane and/or integument and branch out inside the organism. Once the internal organs and nutrients of the prey organism have been consumed, Stylopage will sequentially erect septa within the haustoria as the hyphal cytoplasm is withdrawn, in effect “walling off” the hyphal sections as it empties them. This leaves only the outer membrane of the prey organism, which remains attached to the point of contact on the hyphae, even after the haustoria have withdrawn.

There are species-specific variations on this process. For example, S. hadra, one of the most ubiquitous and well-studied Stylopage species, produces the adhesive material only upon contact with a nematode. Other species, such as S. araea and S. haploe, both of which prey on amoebae, seem to possess vegetative hyphae that are entirely covered with adhesive material. S. hadra often, but not always, produces a bulb-like protuberance at the hyphal point of contact with the nematode. This growth is entirely covered in adhesive, which helps to constrain the larger nematodes caught by S. hadra. Growth of these protuberances is not seen in Stylopage species which prey on comparatively smaller amoebae or nematodes; for example, these protuberances are not seen in S. leiophypha, which preys on nematodes roughly half the length of those on which S. hadra preys.

There is further variation within the amoebophagous species of Stylopage. For example, S. rhabdospora has been observed trapping amoebae directly from conidia, from the site of germ tube growth. Ultrastructure studies of S. rhapdospora have shown that it does produce an adhesive substance at all, yet still manages to hold amoebae in place, due to the fact that it can project haustoria into the amoeba upon contact more quickly than the amoeba can move away. The branches of these haustoria become bulbous in shape once inside the amoeba, so that the amoeba cannot escape.

Uniquely, the type specimen of S. anomala did not exhibit visible predatory behaviour, instead feeding on amoebae that became trapped on its adhesive hyphae and subsequently perished. However, a different strain observed by Malloch & Blackwell did display predatory behaviour, actively trapping and preying on still-living amoebae.

Species-specific preferences have also been observed strikingly in S. araea. Amoebae of the genera Saccamoeba, Naegleria, and Sappinia were targeted by S. araea, but their presence seemed to inhibit conidial formation, instead leaving the fungus to show only vegetative growth. Amoebae infected with the KSL5 giant virus displayed resistance to S. araea, remaining undigested by haustoria. Interestingly, S. araea has also shown the ability to penetrate the protective cysts formed by amoebae to resist the haustoria of species such as Acaulopage.

== Applications ==
There has been limited exploration of Stylopage, among other predatory fungi, as a biological control agent for certain damaging amoebae and nematodes, although no substantive experiments have yet been conducted. The use of S. araea in water treatment systems to limit the presence of infection-causing amoebae has been theorized. Stylopage was one genus of many whose increased predatory soil density was found to be associated with higher root biomass in sugarcane soils, possibly indicating a future use in plant parasite control. However, since known Stylopage species do not produce known amoebicidal or nematicidal toxins, their use as a commercially reproducible biological control agent may be limited.
