= Neoparamoeba pemaquidensis =

Scientific classification
- Domain: Eukaryota
- Supergroup: Amorphea
- Phylum: Amoebozoa
- Class: Discosea
- Order: Dactylopodida
- Family: Vexilliferidae
- Genus: Neoparamoeba
- Species: N. pemaquidensis

Binomial name
- Neoparamoeba pemaquidensis (Page, 1970) Page, 1987

Synonyms
- Paramoeba pemaquidensis Page, 1970

Species of protozoan

Neoparamoeba pemaquidensis is a single-celled species of marine amoebozoan in the genus Neoparamoeba. The species is also called Paramoeba pemaquidensis.

Its closely related sister species, Neoparamoeba perurans, is the agent of amoebic gill disease, which affects Atlantic salmon and other farmed fishes.

The cytoplasm of N. pemaquidensis harbors an endosymbiotic Perkinsela-like organism, referred to as a parasome.
