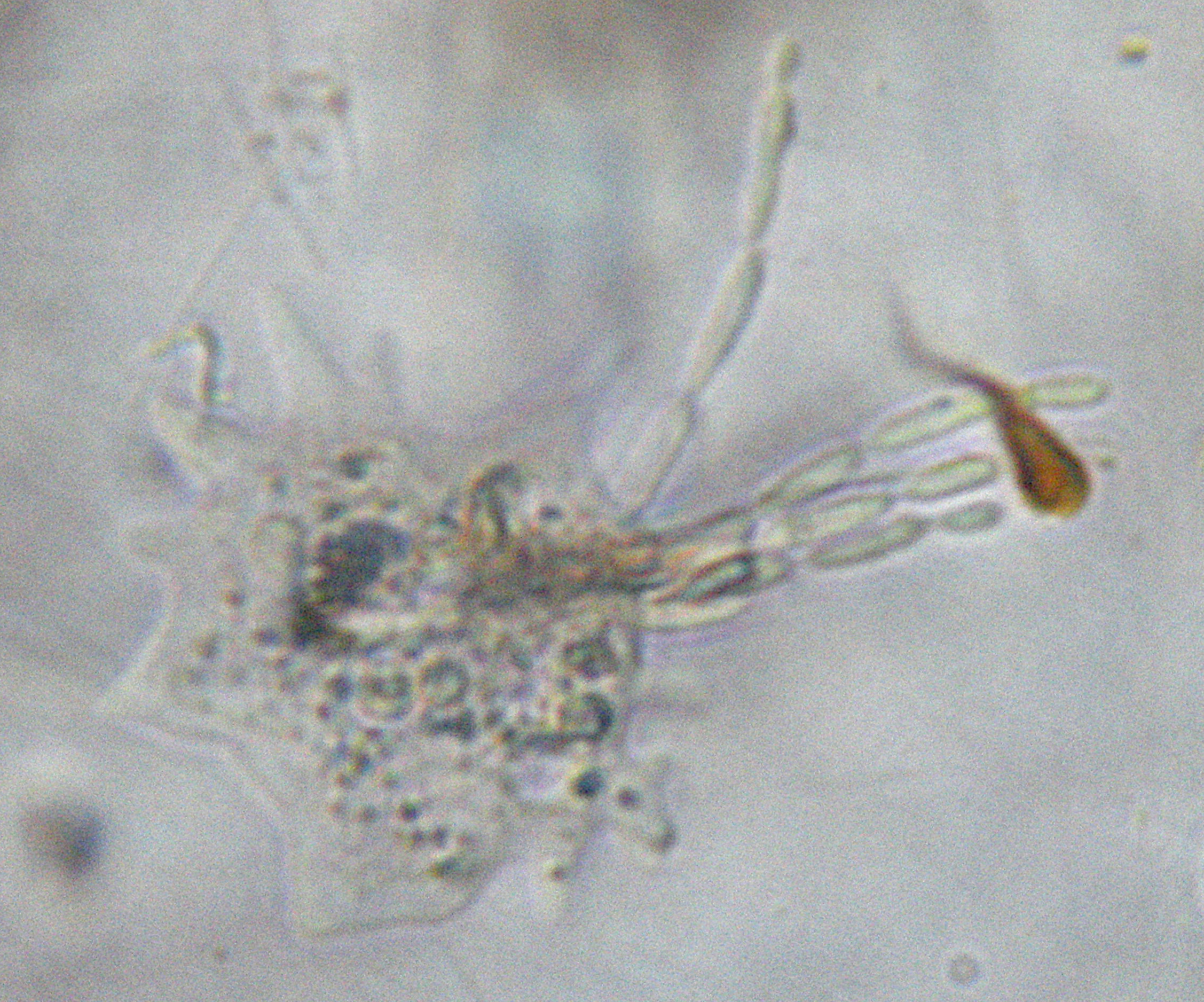
- Thallus of Amoebophilus sp. infecting an unidentified amoeba.

Scientific classification
- Domain: Eukaryota
- Kingdom: Fungi
- Division: Zoopagomycota
- Class: Zoopagomycetes
- Order: Zoopagales
- Family: Cochlonemataceae
- Genus: Amoebophilus; Dangeard (1910)

Type species
- Amoebophilus penardii Dangeard (1910)

= Amoebophilus =

Genus of fungi

Amoebophilus is a genus of zygomycete fungi that parasitizes amoeba.

== Morphology ==
Amoebophilus species are ectoparasites of amoeba. The thallus is composed of an internal haustorium that can be heart-shaped, globose, or lobose. Trailing chains of four or more conidia are produced from the haustorium. Zygospores are spherical at first and become polyhedral with age.

== Ecology ==
Amoebophilus species have been reported from forest and agricultural soils and freshwater ponds where they infect free living amoeba. Infection begins when a conidium comes in contact with an amoeba. The conidium produces a penetration tube to invade the host and form the haustorium. Once the haustorium is formed, the conidium germinates and gives rise to a chain of conidia. Due to difficulties in identifying amoeba, the host ranges of most species are unknown, with the exception of Amoebophilus simplex, which is restricted to species of Mayorella.

== Taxonomy ==
Amoebophilus species were first observed by Leidy in 1874 who mistook them as part of the amoeba and used them to describe a new genus. In 1902, Penard pointed out that the filaments observed by Leidy were in fact a parasite. The genus was formerly erected by Dangeard in 1910 based on parasitized individuals of Pelomyxa vorax; he named the species after Penard.

== Species ==
- Amoebophilus penardii Dangeard
- Amoebophilus caudatus Dangeard
- Amoebophilus korotneffii Dangeard
- Amoebophilus sicyosporus Drechsler
- Amoebophilus dangeardii Miura
- Amoebophilus simplex Barron
