= Paramoebiasis =

Type of marine parasitic disease

Paramoebiasis is a disease caused by species of Paramoeba and Neoparamoeba, amoebas that parasitically target various biological systems of lobsters, sea urchins, crabs, salmon, and other marine life. In fish, it is caused by Neoparamoeba perurans, which targets the respiratory system, and is usually referred to as amoebic gill disease.

Multiple outbreaks of the disease have been attributed to various species across the genera Paramoeba and Neoparamoeba, and species of both genera have been inconsistently taxonomized as a result of different approaches to classification.

== Epidemiology ==
Neoparamoeba species are largely free-living (both non-parasitic and non-endosymbiotic) in marine environments, but some species can become opportunistic parasites in certain conditions which are not well understood. Paramoebiasis can present in a variety of different ways, depending on the species of both the parasite and the host.

=== Respiratory ===
Neoparamoeba perurans causes paramoebiasis in marine farmed fish populations, particularly salmonids, and targets the gills. In advanced stages of the disease, white discoloration and heavy mucus are visible to the naked eye on the gills, and fish may show signs of hypoxia and difficulty breathing.

=== Nervous ===
Among American lobster (Homarus americanus) populations, paramoebiasis has been linked to Neoparamoeba pemaquidensis and targets neurological pathways and circulatory systems, resulting in paresis and ultimately death.

Paramoeba invadens targets the nerve rings of green sea urchins (Strongylocentrotus droebachiensis).

=== Circulatory ===
In blue crabs (Callinectes sapidus), the species Paramoeba perniciosa is linked to "grey crab" disease in northeastern US fisheries. The disease primarily targets the hemolymph, but can also be observed in the endothelia, nervous systems and antennal gland connective tissue. In the later stages of the disease, affected crabs display lethargia, and heavily infected crabs may display muscular necrosis (possibly a result of hypoxia).

== Contributing factors ==
=== Temperature ===
Higher temperatures likely play an important role in the frequency and severity of paramoebiasis epidemics in marine species. In most locations the first appearance of amoebic gill disease in farmed marine fish populations was reported after above-average temperatures, suggesting that the heat tolerance of the fish species is an important factor in whether Neoparamoeba perurans is able to infect.

Paramoeba invadens, the species responsible for frequent outbreaks of paramoebiasis in green sea urchins along the coasts of Nova Scotia, Canada, has been shown to thrive in warmer environments, which indicates that it is likely not indigenous to the Nova Scotia coastline, and is transported to the sea urchin population by high-energy storms like hurricanes. The frequency and severity of paramoebiasis-caused mass mortality events in sea urchin populations in Nova Scotia has increased since 1980, and can be correlated to warmer seawater temperatures due to climate change, as well as the increased frequency of hurricanes along the eastern coast of the United States.

=== Salinity ===
The frequency of amoebic gill disease in salmonids is positively associated with high salinity sea water. Due to the low freshwater tolerance of Neoparamoeba perurans, a common treatment for farmed marine fish populations experiencing amoebic gill disease is the incorporation of routine freshwater baths.

=== Overcrowding ===
More densely packed populations with poor water circulation, such as those often present in farmed marine fish populations, provide opportunities for quick growth and spread of Neoparamoeba species, likely as a result of increased proximity to infected fish and decreased avoidance response options.

== Notable incidents ==
In September 1995, in Nova Scotia, an outbreak of Neoparamoeba invadens within the green sea urchin population caused nearly full mortality of sea urchins along more than 130 kilometers of coastline, and smaller mass mortality events comprising another 40 km. Paramoebiasis caused by N. invadens has been associated with multiple events of recurrent mass mortality in sea urchin populations along the coasts of Nova Scotia, to the point that some researchers have suggested that the disease may have surpassed predation as a means of sea urchin population control in the area.

In late 1999, the disease was responsible for an American lobster mass mortality event in Connecticut and New York, US (roughly 11 million dead, resulting in a 90-99% reduction in lobster harvests); as of 2018, the lobster fishery had not yet recovered from the die-off. A microscopic analysis of viscera and tissue from dead lobsters collected during the event revealed that a protozoan with the characteristics of Paramoeba (later identified as N. pemaquidensis) had infiltrated the lobsters' circulatory and nervous systems.

In 2019 Paramoeba sp. was identified for the first time in Pacific white shrimp in a hatchery in North America, and in 2022, Janickina feisti n. sp. was identified in samples of edible crab in the UK after reports of increased post-capture mortality in 2019.

== See also ==
- Epizootic – Animal disease event, analogous to an epidemic
- Epizootiology – Study of disease patterns within animal populations
- Fish diseases and parasites
- Fish kill
- Protozoan infection
