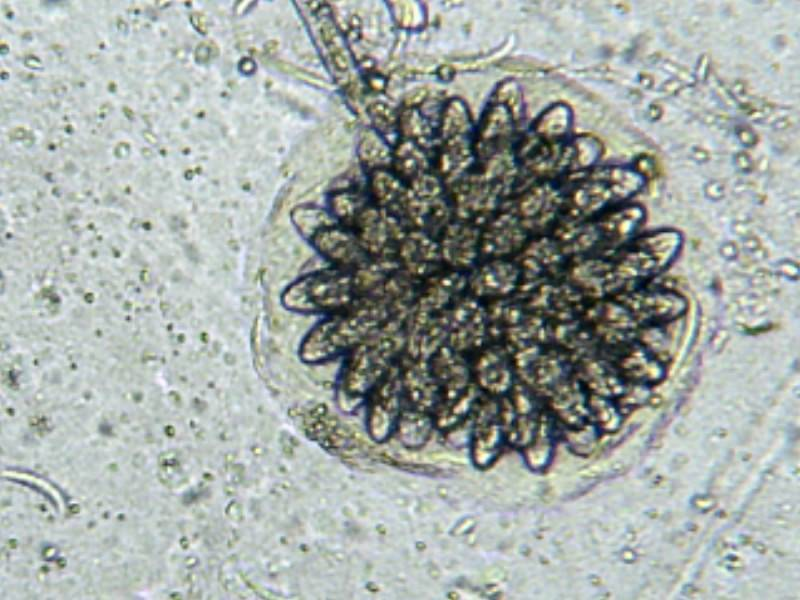
- Rhopalomyces elegans

Scientific classification
- Domain: Eukaryota
- Kingdom: Fungi
- Division: Zoopagomycota
- Class: Zoopagomycetes
- Order: Zoopagales
- Family: Helicocephalidaceae
- Genus: Rhopalomyces; Corda (1839)

Type species
- Rhopalomyces elegans Corda (1839)

Species
- Rhopalomyces bennyi; Rhopalomyces candidus; Rhopalomyces elegans; Rhopalomyces magnus

= Rhopalomyces =

Genus of fungi

Rhopalomyces is a genus of fungi in the family Helicocephalidaceae. The type species, Rhopalomyces elegans, is a predator of nematode eggs.

Verticillium psalliotae is a parasite of Rhopalomyces.
