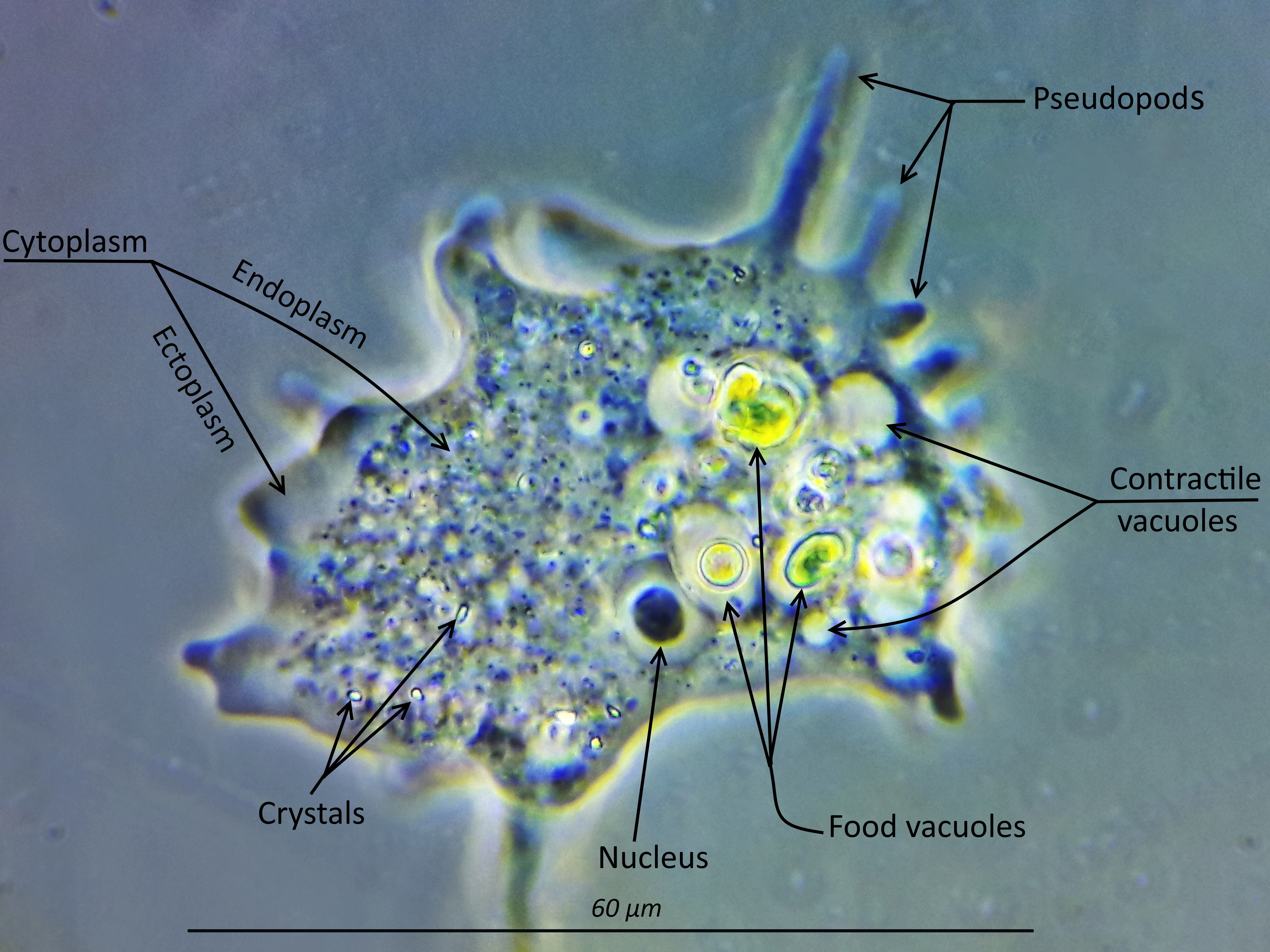
- An unidentified Mayorella species

Scientific classification
- Domain: Eukaryota
- Phylum: Amoebozoa
- Class: Discosea
- Order: Dermamoebida
- Family: Mayorellidae; Schaeffer 1926
- Genus: Mayorella; Schaeffer 1926

Type species
- Mayorella bigemma (Schaeffer 1918) Schaeffer 1926

Diversity
- 31 species

= Mayorella =

Genus of small ameboid protist that inhabits soil, freshwater, and marine environments

Mayorella is a genus of small amoeboid protists in the phylum Amoebozoa. The genus consists of amoebae that exhibit pseudopodia and feed on a variety of organisms through phagocytosis, making them an important group in microbial ecology across most environments worldwide. Mayorella species have been found in soil, freshwater and marine environments.

== Etymology ==
Mayorella was named in the honor of Alfred G. Mayor, curator of natural sciences of the Brooklyn Institute of Arts and Sciences, the founder and first director of the Tortugas Marine Laboratory where the author of the genus, Asa Arthur Schaeffer, was working at the time of the genus' description in 1926.

== Characteristics and ecology ==
Mayorella amoebae use protoplasmic streaming for their movement and feeding. Like many other amoebae, they feed on bacteria, fungi and algae through phagocytosis. Their feeding promotes nutrient regeneration for the habitats, and regulates the populations of algae and bacteria. For this reason they are an important functional group in the ecology of worldwide microbial communities, for which they gain increasing recognition.

Most species of Mayorella have been isolated from soil or freshwater environments, while a few have been reported from marine habitats, two of them from deep-sea areas.

== Classification ==
=== Taxonomic history ===
In 1926 the zoologist Asa Arthur Schaeffer established the order Mayorella in the monotypic family Mayorellidae. The taxonomic history of the genus was complex. Many amoebae had similar morphology to Mayorella had either a thick, multi-layered cell coat (or cuticle), or scales on the surface of the cell membrane. The zoologist Frederick C. Page created the genus Hollandella to gather all Mayorella-like species with cuticle, but the type species of this genus had scales instead of a cuticle, so the genus was abandoned. The species with scales were instead placed under the genus Dactylamoeba, which was later formally replaced with the name Korotnevella.

The diversity of Mayorella-like amoebae is high, but the distinction between species of the genus is difficult and requires electron microscopy of the cell surface. Many species that were described by light microscopy are hardly recognizable and do not have reliable available descriptions.

In 2004 it was placed in the order Dermamoebida, whose members are naked amoebae with a thick glycocalyx.

=== Species ===
The genus Mayorella includes:

1. Mayorella augusta Schaeffer 1926
2. Mayorella bigemma (Schaeffer 1918) Schaeffer 1928
  = Amoeba bigemma Schaeffer 1918
3. Mayorella cantabrigiensis Page 1983
4. Mayorella dactylifera Goodkov & Buryakov 1988
5. Mayorella gemmifera Schaeffer 1926
6. Mayorella kuwaitensis Page 1981) Page 1982
  = Hollandella kuwaitensis Page 1981
7. Mayorella marianaensis Lei, Chen, Chen & Liang 2023
8. Mayorella palestinensis K.Reich 1933
9. Mayorella penardi Page 1972
10. Mayorella vespertilioides Page 1983
11. Mayorella viridis Cann 1981
