= Paramoeba =

Scientific classification
- Domain: Eukaryota
- Supergroup: Amorphea
- Phylum: Amoebozoa
- Class: Discosea
- Order: Dactylopodida
- Family: Paramoebidae
- Genus: Paramoeba; Schaudinn 1896

Type species
- Paramoeba eilhardi Schaudinn 1896

Species
- P. aparasomata Volkova et al. 2019; P. eilhardi Schaudinn 1896; ?P. hamiltoni; ?P. hominis Craig 1906; P. karteshi Volkova et al. 2019; ?P. perniciosa Sprague, Beckett & Sawyer 1969; P. perurans (Young et al. 2007) Feehan et al. 2013; ?P. schaudinni de Faria, Cunha & Pinto 1922

Genus of parasites

Paramoeba is a genus of common parasites, including species that can cause paramoebiasis in the blue crab, Callinectes sapidus.
