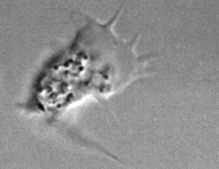
- Vexillifera bacillipedes

Scientific classification
- Domain: Eukaryota
- Phylum: Amoebozoa
- Class: Discosea
- Order: Dactylopodida
- Family: Vexilliferidae
- Genus: Vexillifera; Schaeffer, 1926

Type species
- Vexillifera ambulacralis (Penard 1890) Schaeffer 1926

Species
- V. abyssalis Kudryavtsev, Pawlowski & Alexey 2018; ?V. anapes Bovee 1985; ?V. arionoides Bovee 1985; V. ambulacralis (Penard 1890) Schaeffer 1926; V. armata Page 1979; V. aurea Schaeffer 1926; V. bacillipedes Page 1969; V. browni Sawyer 1975; ?V. dadayi (Lepşi 1960); ?V. displacata Bovee 1985; ?V. filopodia Bovee 1985; V. expectata Dykova et al. 1998; V. fluvialis Dykova, Kostka & Peckova 2011; V. granatensis Mascaro, Osuna & Mascaro 1986; V. kereti Kudryavtsev, Pawlowski & Alexey 2018; V. minuta Bovee 1985; V. minutissima Bovee & Sawyer 1979; V. multispinosa Dykova, Kostka & Peckova 2011; V. ottoi Sawyer 1975; ?V. spinoa Bovee 1985; ?V. subula Bovee 1985; V. tasmaniana Dykova, Kostka & Peckova 2011; ?V. telma Bovee 1985; V. telmathalassa Bovee 1956; V. variabilis Bovee 1985; ?V. westveldii Van Wichelen & Vanormelingen 2016

= Vexillifera =

Genus of amoebae

Vexillifera is a genus of Amoebozoa.

It is possible for it to be present in swimming pools.
