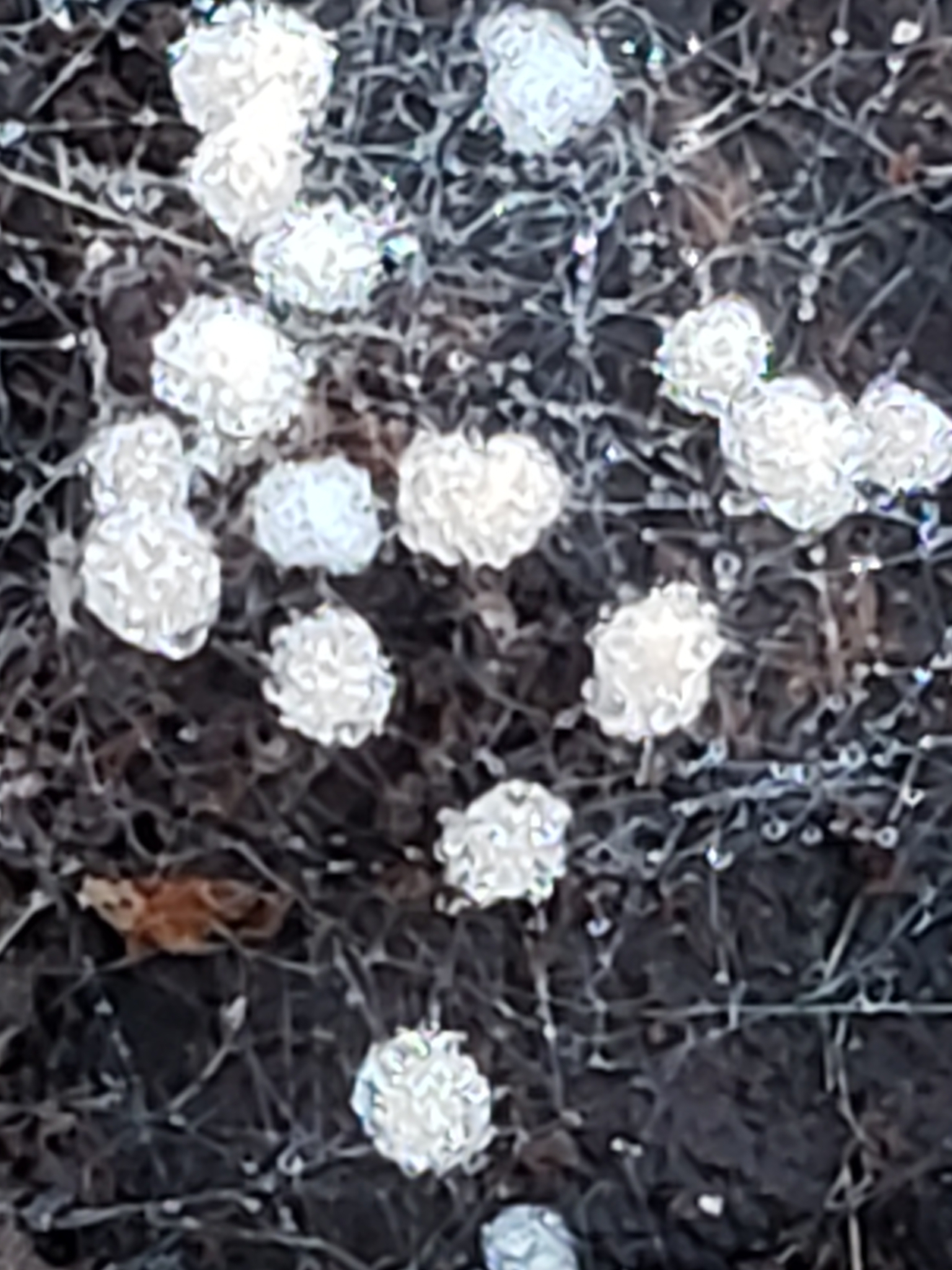

Scientific classification
- Kingdom: Fungi
- Division: Zoopagomycota
- Class: Zoopagomycetes
- Order: Zoopagales
- Family: Sigmoideomycetaceae; Benny, R.K.Benj. & P.M.Kirk (1992)

Type genus
- Sigmoideomyces Thaxt. (1891)

Genera
- Reticulocephalis; Sigmoideomyces; Sphondylocephalum

= Sigmoideomycetaceae =

Family of fungi

The Sigmoideomycetaceae are a family of fungi in the order Zoopagales. The family contains three genera, and four species. The family was circumscribed in 1992.

- Reticulocephalis (2 spp.) putative haustorial parasite of fungi
- Sigmoideomyces (1 sp) putative haustorial parasite of fungi
- Sphondylocephalum (1 sp) haustorial parasite of fungi
