= Korotnevella =

Scientific classification
- Domain: Eukaryota
- Supergroup: Amorphea
- Phylum: Amoebozoa
- Class: Discosea
- Order: Dactylopodida
- Family: Paramoebidae
- Genus: Korotnevella; Goodkov, 1988

Type species
- Korotnevella bulla (Schaeffer 1926) Goodkov 1988

Species
- K. bulla (Schaeffer 1926) Goodkov 1988; K. diskophora Smirnov 1999; K. fousta Udalov 2016; K. hemistylolepis O’Kelly et al. 2001; K. heteracantha Udalov 2015; K. jeppesenii van Wichelen & Vanormelingen 2016; K. limbata Udalov 2015; K. monacantholepis O’Kelly et al. 2001; K. nivo Smirnov 1997; K. novazelandica Udalov, Voelcker & Smirnov 2017; K. pelagolacustris Van Wichelen & Vanormelingen 2016; K. stella (Schaeffer 1926) Goodkov 1988; K. venosa Udalov, Zlatogursky & Smirnov 2016

Synonyms
- Dactylamoeba Korotnev 1880

Genus of protozoans

Korotnevella is a genus of Amoebozoa.

It includes the species Korotnevella hemistylolepis.
