= Zoopagaceae =

Scientific classification
- Kingdom: Fungi
- Division: Zoopagomycota
- Class: Zoopagomycetes
- Order: Zoopagales
- Family: Zoopagaceae; Drechsler (1938)

Type genus
- Zoopage Drechsler (1938)

Genera
- Acaulopage; Cystopage; Lecophagus; Stylopage; Zoopage; Zoophagus

Family of fungi

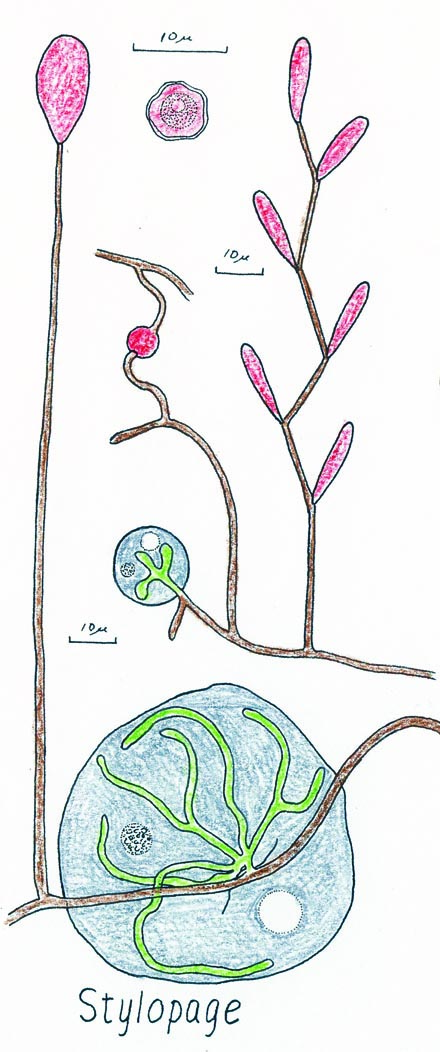
Stylopage, illustration

The Zoopagaceae are a family of fungi in the Zoopagales order. The family contains 6 genera, and 78 species. The family was circumscribed in 1938.
