= Epizootic shell disease =

Infection of the outer shell layer of the American lobster by chitinolytic bacteria

Epizootic Shell Disease (ESD) is an infection of the outer shell layer of the American lobster (Homarus americanus) by chitinolytic bacteria. Infection results in lesions and the degradation of each layer of shell, resulting in secondary bacterial infections and potentially death.

== Discovery and spread ==
Epizootic Shell Disease(ESD) was first identified in Long Island Sound in the 1990s. ESD then spread into the Southern New England Lobster fishery, infecting up to 40% of the lobster population. Widespread ESD has generally failed to spread to northern portions of the Gulf of Maine and Nova Scotia. While ESD spread throughout Long Island Sounds, the fishery's annual lobster catch fell from 3.7 million pounds in 1998 to just 142,000 pounds in 2011

== Population level impacts ==
Moderate to severe levels of infection have been shown to cut survival rates of adult lobsters by as much as a third and have been found to have infected up to 85% of egg bearing females in Long Island Sound - 16 times higher than the population average. ESD in egg bearing females could be a major contributor to the rapid decline of lobster populations in Southern New England. The prevalence of ESD in this segment of the population could severely limit reproduction, exacerbating declines in population wide survival rates. This level of infection could be due to females not being able to molt while ovigerous. This prevents them from losing their diseased shell and producing a new, healthy shell.

== Effects of climate change ==
One theory for the southern containment of Epizootic Shell Disease is that warm ocean bottom temperatures could be one of the main enabling conditions for ESD. In 2016, after multiple warmer than average summers, infection rates jumped from <1% to 1.25% in coastal Maine. Further, in 2017, a team of researchers and students from Bowdoin College’s research station on Kent Island in the Bay of Fundy reported a mass low tide stranding of Jonah Crabs, Cancer borealis, infected with a shell disease resembling ESD. This was a first-of-its kind observation in the Bay of Fundy and the other cold waters off of Nova Scotia.

=== Warming ocean temperatures ===
The Northwest Atlantic is warming at a faster rate than 99% of the ocean. Sea Surface Temperatures (SST) in the region are expected to increase by 2.3-4.3°C by 2100. This level of warming could result in an increase in the number of days the lobster population experiences heat related stresses (considered above 20°C) which could add to a possible spread of ESD at rates previously observed in Southern New England and Long Island Sound.

A strong correlation has been found between increased temperature and an increased rate of disease progression (total change in diseased area). 18°C saw an average overall disease progression 2.8X greater than the 6°C and an average daily progression 2.5X greater. With these rates, it was estimated that progression from initial infection to a moderate level of infection would take just 94 days at 18°C, compared to 232 days at 6°C.

=== Ocean acidification ===
Exposure to elevated levels of dissolved CO_{2}, resulting in a lower pH, has been shown to significantly reduce the growth rates of American lobsters. This has potentially significant implications for the commercial fishery that is priced by the pound. As time exposed to lower pH increased, so did the chances of a lobster developing shell disease, possibly because the physiological stress of low pH could inhibit the immune response of the lobsters. Lobsters have also shown an increase in intermolt time with lower pH, suggesting the resulting decreased calcification could also predispose the lobsters to shell disease infection.
