= Cochlonemataceae =

Scientific classification
- Kingdom: Fungi
- Division: Zoopagomycota
- Class: Zoopagomycetes
- Order: Zoopagales
- Family: Cochlonemataceae

Genera
- Amoebophilus; Aplectosoma; Bdellospora; Cochlonema; Endocochlus; Euryancale

Family of fungi

The family Cochlonemataceae is a fungus classified in the order Zoopagales. Fungi found in this family are predominantly parasitic and can be found in any substrate that contains an ample amount of host or prey organisms.

The family contains six genera.
