= Piptocephalidaceae =

Scientific classification
- Kingdom: Fungi
- Division: Zoopagomycota
- Class: Zoopagomycetes
- Family: Piptocephalidaceae; J.Schröt. (1886)

Type genus
- Piptocephalis de Bary (1865)

Genera
- Kuzuhaea; Piptocephalis; Syncephalis

Synonyms
- Mucoricola Nieuwl. (1916)

Family of fungi

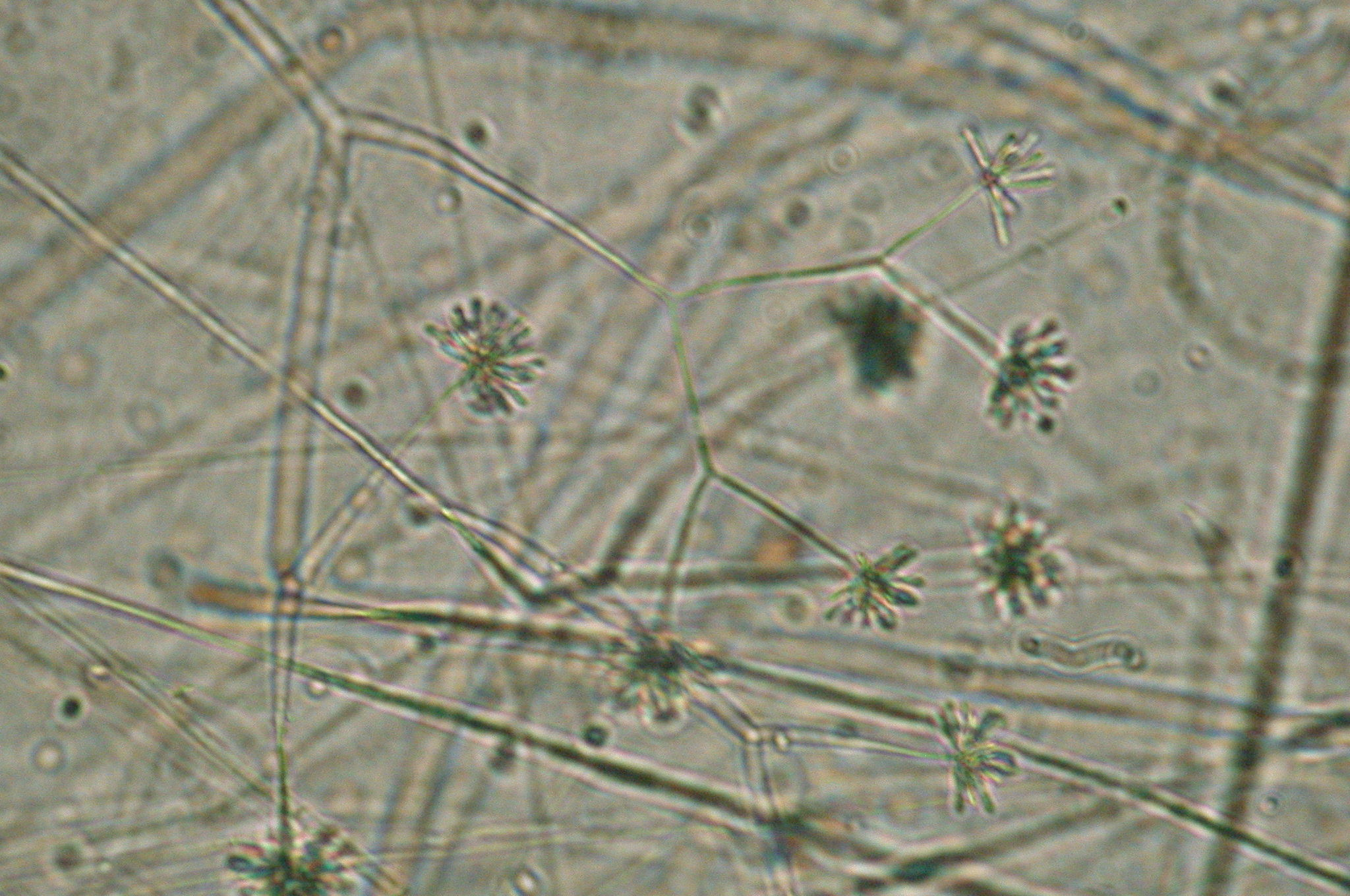
Piptocephalis

The Piptocephalidaceae are a family of fungi in the Zoopagales order. The family contains 3 genera, and 70 species.

- Kuzuhaea (1 sp.) haustorial parasite of fungi (mostly of Mucorales spp.)
- Piptocephalis (25 spp.) haustorial parasite of fungi (mostly of Mucorales spp.)
- Syncephalis (61 spp.) haustorial parasite of fungi (mostly of Mortierellales and Mucorales spp.)
