= Acaulopage =

Scientific classification
- Domain: Eukaryota
- Kingdom: Fungi
- Division: Zoopagomycota
- Class: Zoopagomycetes
- Order: Zoopagales
- Family: Zoopagaceae
- Genus: Acaulopage; Drechsler (1935)

Type species
- Acaluopage rhaphidospora Drechsler (1935)

Genus of fungi

Acaulopage is a genus in the former Zygomycota that preys on amoeba.

== Morphology ==
Species of Acaulopage are characterized by coenocytic hyphae that have patches of yellowish adhesive patches used to capture amoeba. Conidia are borne directly on the hyphae and vary widely in morphology. Many bear one to many empty appendages. For example, A. marantica conidia have a single appendage; A. tetraceros conidia have an average of four appendages; and, A. lasiospora conidia are covered in appendages. Zygospores are globose with ornamented walls.

== Ecology ==
Species are often recovered from soil or leaf litter placed on agar in Petri dishes. Acaulopage tetroceros is the most commonly reported species.

== Species ==
According to Gerald L. Benny, there are 27 species of Acaulopage.

- Acaulopage acanthospora Drechsler 1938
- Acaulopage aristata Jones 1959
- Acaulopage baulispora Drechsler 1948
- Acaulopage ceratospora Drechsler 1935
- Acaulopage cercospora Drechsler 1936
- Acaulopage crobylospora Drechsler 1947
- Acaulopage dactylophora Drechsler 1955
- Acaulopage dasyspora Drechsler 1955
- Acaulopage dichotoma Drechsler 1945
- Acaulopage gomphoclada Drechsler 1942
- Acaulopage gyrinoides Drechsler 1948
- Acaulopage hystricospora Drechsler 1946
- Acaulopage ischnospora Drechsler 1947
- Acaulopage lasiospora Drechsler 1942
- Acaulopage longicornis Drechsler 1955
- Acaulopage lophospora Drechsler 1946
- Acaulopage macrospora Drechsler 1935
- Acaulopage marantica Drechsler 1939
- Acaulopage retusa Jones 1959
- Acaulopage rhaphidospora Drechsler 1935
- Acaulopage rhicnospora Drechsler 1935
- Acaulopage stenospora Drechsler 1941
- Acaulopage tenuicornis Drechsler 1959
- Acaulopage tetraceros Drechsler 1935
- Acaulopage tigrina C. Ciccicone 1989
- Acaulopage trachyspora Drechsler 1959
