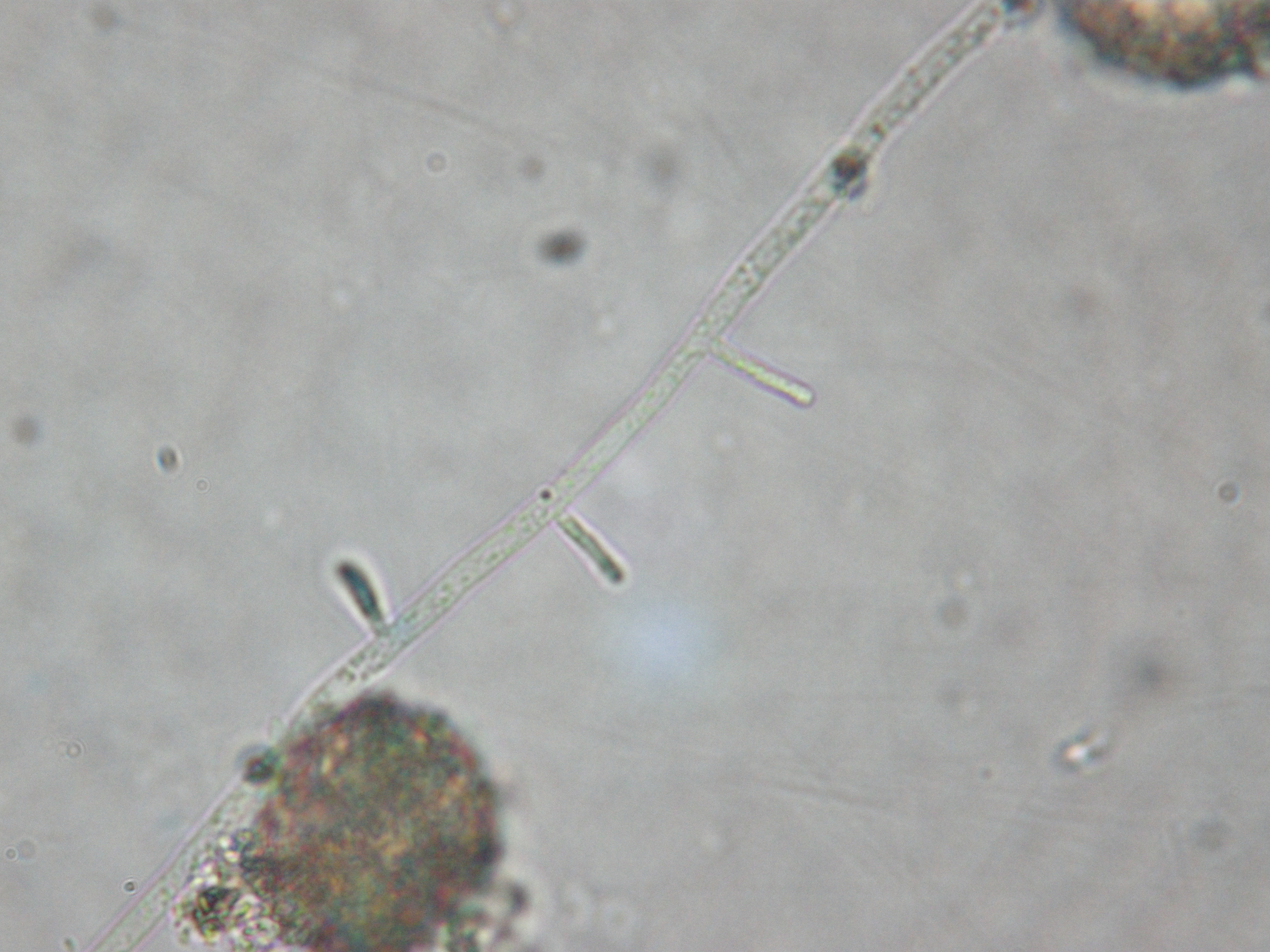
- Hyphae of Zoophagus sp. displaying the lateral traps that rotifers get stuck on.

Scientific classification
- Domain: Eukaryota
- Kingdom: Fungi
- Division: Zoopagomycota
- Class: Zoopagomycetes
- Order: Zoopagales
- Family: Zoopagaceae
- Genus: Zoophagus; Sommerstorff

Type species
- Zoophagus insidians Sommerstorff

= Zoophagus =

Genus of fungi

Zoophagus is a genus of zygomycete fungi that preys on rotifers and nematodes. It was established in 1911 by Sommerstorff, who originally considered it to be an oomycete. It is common in a variety of freshwater habitats, such as ponds and sewage treatment plants.

== Morphology ==
The mycelium is composed of non-septate hyphae that bear lateral adhesive pegs. Spores are sometimes septate long, fusiform merosporangia with tapered ends that are borne on lateral sporangiophores.

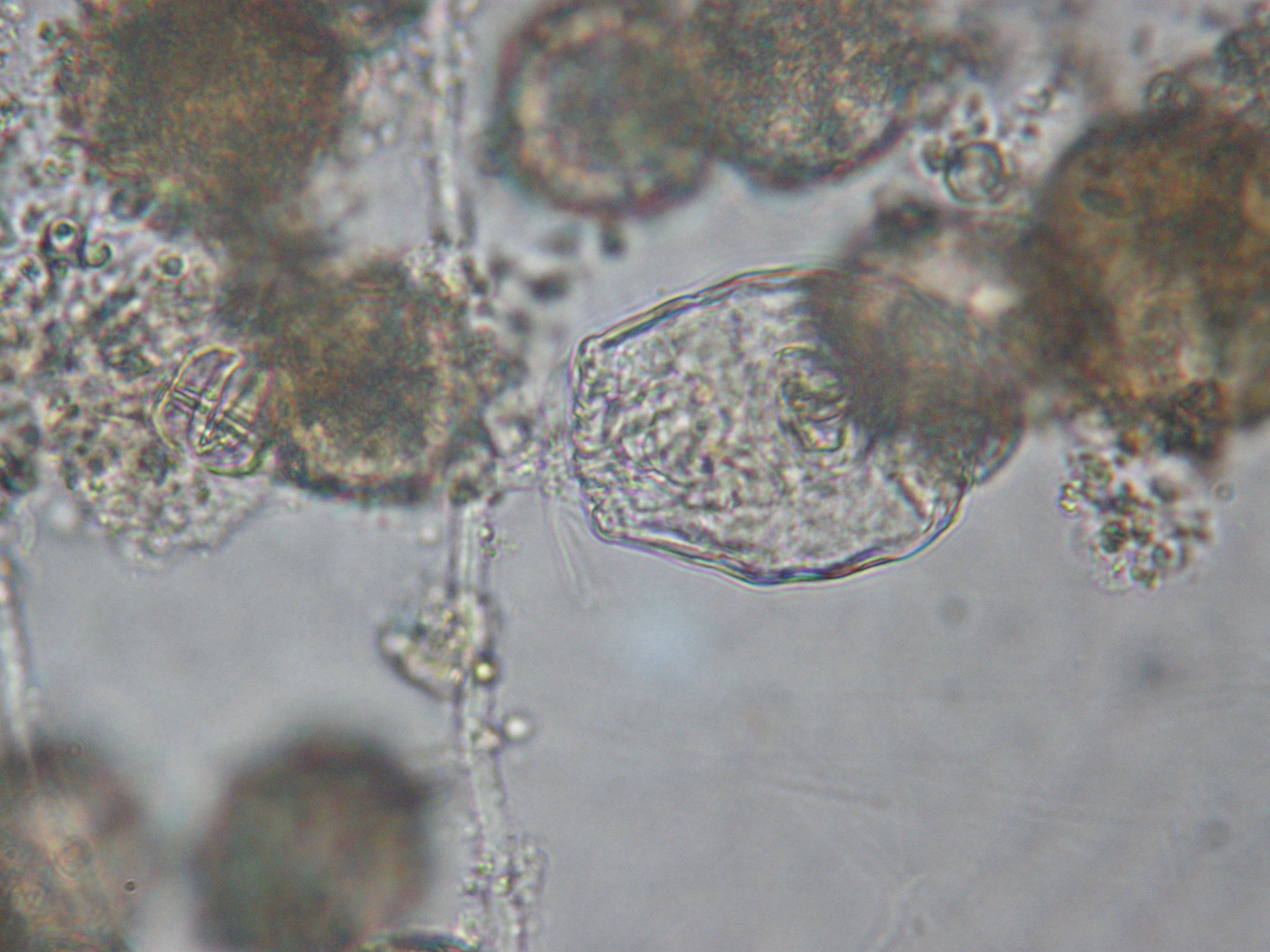
Hyphae of Zoophagus insidians collected from a moss path in an intermittent stream/drainage ditch (Coventry Township, Summit County, Ohio, USA) with a trapped rotifer.

== Ecology ==
Zoophagus species have been reported from ponds, brooks, and fens, usually in association with algae or decaying plant matter. Exceptions are Z. cornus, which was described from rice paddy mud, and Z. pectosporus, which was described from moss and additionally reported from leaf litter. Zoophagus insidians in particular has also been reported from sewage treatment plants where it can pose a significant threat to water quality. Zoophagus spp. prey on a variety of rotifer species. Zoophagus pectosporus primarily preys on nematodes and seems to be restricted to species of Bunonema, though it is also capable of trapping rotifers. When prey encounter one of the traps, an adhesive is released and the animal is caught. Hyphae later grow into the body and digest it.

== Species ==
- Zoophagus insidians Sommerstorff – type species
- Zoophagus cornus Glockling
- Zoophagus pectosporus (Dreschler) M.W. Dick
- Zoophagus tentaclum Karling
- Zoophagus tylopagus Xing Y. Liu & K.Q. Zhang
