= Mayorella marianaensis =

Scientific classification
- Domain: Eukaryota
- Phylum: Amoebozoa
- Class: Discosea
- Order: Dermamoebida
- Family: Mayorellidae
- Genus: Mayorella
- Species: M. marianaensis

Binomial name
- Mayorella marianaensis Lei, Chen, Chen & Liang 2023

Species of deep-sea amoeba

Mayorella marianaensis is a species of amoebozoan protist discovered in 2023 in Mariana Trench sediments. It belongs to the order Dermamoebida, a group of naked amoebae with a thick glycocalyx.

== Discovery ==
Cells of Mayorella marianaensis were isolated and cultivated from deep-sea sediments at a depth of 3,144 meters in the vicinity of the Mariana Trench, in the Pacific Ocean. The culture was characterized as a new Mayorella species through morphological and phylogenetic analyses using SSU rRNA genes. The results were published by Xiaoli Lei, Xiaojuan Chen, Jianming Chen and Chen Liang in the journal Protist in June 2023.

== Morphology ==
Mayorella marianaensis locomotive cells have an average width of 74 μm and length of 28 μm. In addition there are three floating forms identified. The most common floating form is an irregular sphere of 25–47 μm in diameter. The second floating form has between 18 and 25 very small pseudopodia (around 9–30 μm in length), while the third has about 6 to 9 thin and radiating pseudopodia (around 25–125 μm in length). The cell coat (or cuticle) outside of the plasma membrane is around 190 to 290 nm thick and consists of two layers: an outer layer, loosely arranged, with its surface covered with hairs called glycostyles; and an inner layer, closely arranged in stripes.
