= Perkinsela =

Scientific classification
- Domain: Eukaryota
- Supergroup: Discoba
- Phylum: Euglenozoa
- Class: Kinetoplastea
- Order: Prokinetoplastida
- Family: Perkinselidae
- Genus: Perkinsela

Genus of flagellated protists

Perkinsela is a genus of kinetoplastids. Species are obligate intracellular components of Neoparamoeba and their relationship is considered mutualistic. The mitochondrial genome of Perkinsela species contains considerable gene loss and errors in RNA editing.
