= Paramoebidae =

Scientific classification
- Domain: Eukaryota
- Supergroup: Amorphea
- Phylum: Amoebozoa
- Class: Discosea
- Order: Dactylopodida
- Family: Paramoebidae; Poche 1913

Genera
- Cunea; Janickina; Korotnevella; Neoparamoeba; Paramoeba

Family of protozoans

Paramoebidae is a family of Amoebozoa, classified under Dactylopodida. It has also been classified under Gymnamoebae. It includes the genera Korotnevella, Hollandella, and Paramoeba.
