= Vexilliferidae =

Scientific classification
- Domain: Eukaryota
- Phylum: Amoebozoa
- Class: Discosea
- Order: Dactylopodida
- Family: Vexilliferidae; Page 1987

Genera
- Astramoeba; Pseudoparamoeba; Vexillifera

Family of protozoans

Vexilliferidae is a family of Amoebozoa, classified under Dactylopodida.

It has also been classified under Gymnamoebia.

It includes the genera Neoparamoeba, Pseudoparamoeba and Vexillifera.
