= Crustacyanin =

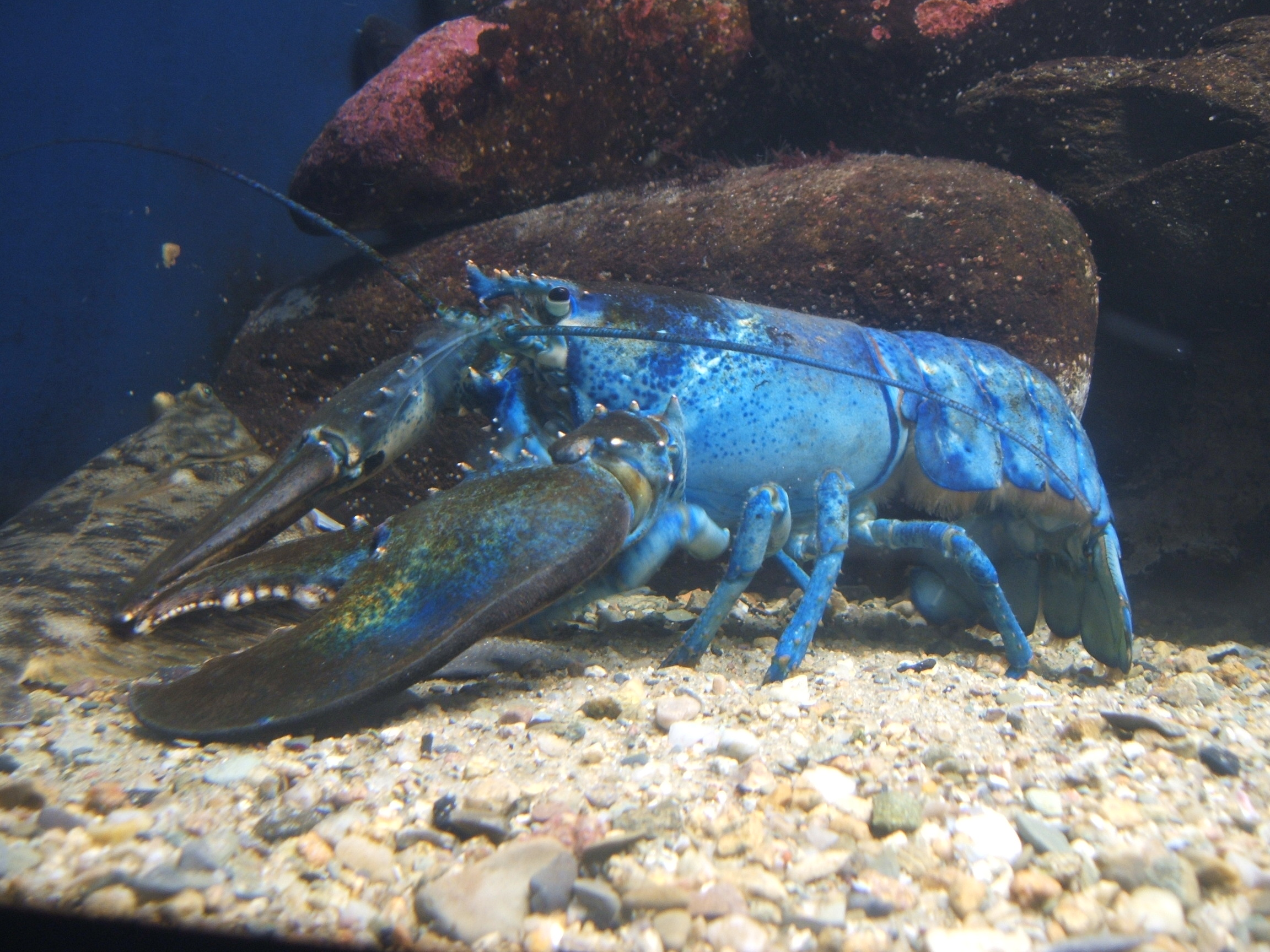
Crustacyanin is a biological pigment responsible for giving lobsters and blue crabs their blue colour.

Crustacyanin is a carotenoprotein biological pigment found in the exoskeleton of lobsters and blue crabs and responsible for their blue colour. β-Crustacyanin (β-CR) is composed of two stacked astaxanthin carotenoids that absorb at λ = 580–590 nm (2.10–2.14 eV). α-crustacyanin (α-CR) is an assembly of eight β-CR protein dimers. It is a 320 kDa (atomic mass) complex containing 16 astaxanthin molecules. Although the β-CR dimer has a peak wavelength of 580 nm, α-CR exhibits a bathochromic shift to 632 nm; the mechanism and function of the additional wavelength shift is not understood.
