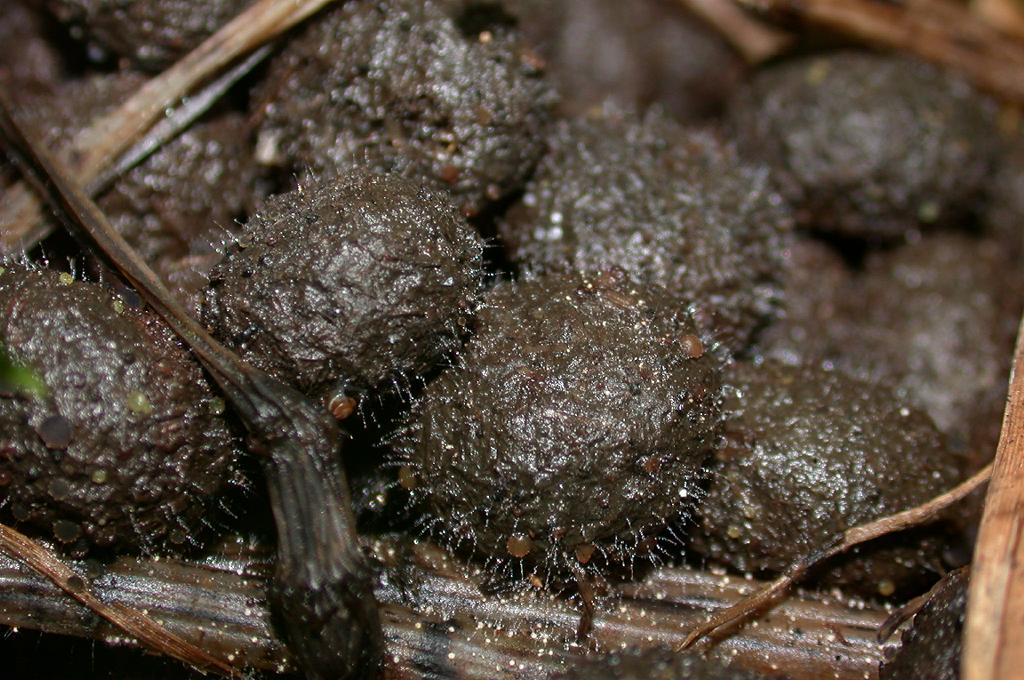

Scientific classification
- Kingdom: Fungi
- Division: Zoopagomycota
- Class: Zoopagomycetes
- Order: Zoopagales
- Family: Helicocephalidaceae; Boedijn (1959)

Type genus
- Helicocephalum Thaxt. (1891)

Genera
- Brachymyces; Helicocephalum; Rhopalomyces; Verrucocephalum

= Helicocephalidaceae =

Family of fungi

The Helicocephalidaceae are a family of fungi in the Zoopagales order. The family contains 4 genera and 13 species.
