= Amoebic gill disease =

Disease of fish

Amoebic gill disease (AGD) is a potentially fatal type of paramoebiasis which infects the gills of certain species of marine fish. AGD is caused by Neoparamoeba perurans, and primarily affects farm-raised fish of the family Salmonidae. Outbreaks of the disease have also been reported in populations of turbot, seabass, and seabream.

The disease was first observed in the summers of 1984 and 1985 in populations of farmed salmonids in Tasmania, Australia. It was initially misattributed to N. pemaquadensis, but in 2008 was proven to be caused by N. perurans. Since its discovery, AGD has impacted commercial salmonid fisheries in nearly every salmon-producing country, and has increased production costs in some cases by up to 25%.

High salinity (near 35‰) and warm seawater (12 – 20°C) are positively associated with outbreaks of AGD.

== Clinical signs and diagnosis ==
Symptoms typically begin to appear two months after the fish are transferred from freshwater hatcheries to open net sea cages. Visible symptoms include mucus build-up on the gills of infected fish and hyperplasic lesions, causing white spots and eventual deterioration of the gill tissue. Symptoms in affected fish may include anorexia and shortness of breath indicators such as lethargy or flared opercula.

Fresh gill biopsies can be observed under the microscope for amoebas, or tested using fluorescent antibody testing.

== Treatment and control ==
Currently, the most effective treatment is transferring the affected fish to a freshwater bath for a period of 2 to 3 hours. This is achieved by towing the sea cages into fresh water, or pumping the fish from the sea cage to a tarp filled with fresh water. Productivity of salmon aquaculture is limited by difficulty and cost of treatment and access to a freshwater source.

Mortality rates have been experimentally lowered by adding levamisole, chloramine-T, or chlorine dioxide to the fresh water baths at various concentrations. Other potential in-feed treatments such as L-cysteine ethyl ester (a mucolytic compound) and the parasiticide bithionol have been tested with some success, although not developed for commercial use.
