= Neoparamoeba =

Scientific classification
- Domain: Eukaryota
- Supergroup: Amorphea
- Phylum: Amoebozoa
- Class: Discosea
- Order: Dactylopodida
- Family: Vexilliferidae
- Genus: Neoparamoeba; Page 1987

Type species
- Neoparamoeba pemaquidensis (Page 1970) Page 1987

Species
- Neoparamoeba aestuarina (Page 1970) Page 1987; Neoparamoeba atlantica Kudryavtsev, Pawlowski & Hausmann 2011; Neoparamoeba branchipila Dykova et al. 2005; Neoparamoeba invadens (Jones 1985); Neoparamoeba longipodia Volkova & Kudryavtsev 2017; Neoparamoeba pemaquidensis (Page 1970) Page 1987

Genus of protozoans

Neoparamoeba is a genus of Amoebozoa. Species contain intracellular kinetoplastid parasites, of the genus Perkinsela, which are maintained in close contact with the nucleus and are considered obligatory and mutualistic.
