= Dactylopodida =

Scientific classification
- Domain: Eukaryota
- Supergroup: Amorphea
- Phylum: Amoebozoa
- Class: Discosea
- Subclass: Flabellinia
- Order: Dactylopodida; Smirnov et al., 2005

Families
- Paramoebidae; Vexilliferidae

Order of protozoans

Dactylopodida is an Amoebozoa grouping.
