= Zoopagales =

Scientific classification
- Kingdom: Fungi
- Division: Zoopagomycota
- Class: Zoopagomycetes
- Order: Zoopagales; Bessey ex R.K.Benj. (1979)

Families
- Cochlonemataceae; Helicocephalidaceae; Piptocephalidaceae; Sigmoideomycetaceae; Zoopagaceae Genera incertae sedis Basidiolum Massartia

Order of fungi

The Zoopagales is an order of fungi in the subdivision Zoopagomycotina. Most species are parasites or predators of microscopic creatures such as amoebae. They also prey on rotifers. The order contains 5 families, 22 genera, and 190 species.
