= List of Onthophagus species =

This is a list of 2257 species in the genus Onthophagus. The species and subgenera reflect the Catalog of Life and the World Scarabaeidae Database (2023).

== Onthophagus species ==
Genus Onthophagus Latreille, 1802
Subgenus Afrostrandius Moretto, 2009

Onthophagus adspersus Orbigny, 1908
Onthophagus bimetallicus Orbigny, 1907
Onthophagus demeyeri Moretto, 2009
Onthophagus granulipennis Lansberge, 1886
Onthophagus loxodontaphilus Moretto, 2009
Onthophagus plebejus Klug, 1855
Onthophagus pseudoplebejus Moretto, 2009
Onthophagus tigrinus Orbigny, 1908

Subgenus Altonthophagus Kabakov, 1990

Onthophagus cervenkai Kabakov, 2008
Onthophagus concolor Sharp, 1878
Onthophagus cupreiceps Arrow, 1907
Onthophagus inelegans Balthasar, 1935
Onthophagus kozlovi Kabakov, 1990
Onthophagus kukunorensis Kabakov, 1990
Onthophagus marmotae Kabakov, 1990
Onthophagus sibiricus Harold, 1877
Onthophagus tibetanus Arrow, 1907
Onthophagus turpidoides Kabakov, 2008
Onthophagus turpidus Reitter, 1887
Onthophagus uniformis Heyden, 1886

Subgenus Amphionthophagus Martín-Piera & Zunino, 1983
Onthophagus falzonii Goidanich, 1926
Onthophagus melitaeus (Fabricius, 1798)
Onthophagus numidicus Orbigny, 1908
Subgenus Bicornonthophagus Tagliaferri & Moretto, 2012

Onthophagus auriculatus Klug, 1855
Onthophagus beiranus Péringuey, 1908
Onthophagus cornifrons Thomson, 1858
Onthophagus decorsei Orbigny, 1908
Onthophagus emeritus Péringuey, 1901
Onthophagus latestriatus Orbigny, 1908
Onthophagus reticulatus Orbigny, 1902
Onthophagus rotundibasis Orbigny, 1902

Subgenus Colobonthophagus Balthasar, 1935

Onthophagus aenescens (Wiedemann, 1823)
Onthophagus agnus Gillet, 1925
Onthophagus armatus Blanchard, 1853
Onthophagus arunensis Scheuern, 1995
Onthophagus bengalensis Harold, 1886
Onthophagus bison Boucomont, 1919
Onthophagus caprai Frey, 1956
Onthophagus dama (Fabricius, 1798)
Onthophagus ephippioderus Arrow, 1907
Onthophagus hindu Arrow, 1931
Onthophagus lahorensis Kabakov, 2008
Onthophagus lunatus Harold, 1868
Onthophagus metalliceps Arrow, 1931
Onthophagus nagasawai Matsumura, 1938
Onthophagus neocolobus Scheuern, 1996
Onthophagus occipitalis Lansberge, 1885
Onthophagus paliceps Arrow, 1931
Onthophagus pardalis (Fabricius, 1798)
Onthophagus piceorufulus Kabakov, 1994
Onthophagus piffli Petrovitz, 1961
Onthophagus poggii Scheuern, 1996
Onthophagus quadridentatus (Fabricius, 1798)
Onthophagus ramosellus Bates, 1891
Onthophagus ramosus (Wiedemann, 1823)
Onthophagus shillongensis Scheuern, 1995
Onthophagus thai Kabakov, 1994
Onthophagus tragoides Boucomont, 1914
Onthophagus tragus (Fabricius, 1792)
Onthophagus transquadridentatus Scheuern, 1995
Onthophagus triceratops Arrow, 1913
Onthophagus urellus Boucomont, 1919

Subgenus Cryptonthophagus Dierkens, 2022

Onthophagus convexipennis Dierkens, 2022
Onthophagus flavipleurus Dierkens, 2022
Onthophagus granulopygus Dierkens, 2022
Onthophagus iringaensis Dierkens, 2022
Onthophagus kapangaensis Dierkens, 2022
Onthophagus lilongweensis Dierkens, 2022
Onthophagus mwenseensis Dierkens, 2022
Onthophagus planidorsis Dierkens, 2022
Onthophagus ugandaensis Dierkens, 2022

Subgenus Drepanonthophagus Dierkens, 2022
Onthophagus bellus Orbigny, 1905
Onthophagus gradivus Balthasar, 1966
Onthophagus renejeanneli Dierkens, 2022
Subgenus Endrodius Balthasar, 1959
Onthophagus baeri Boucomont, 1914
Onthophagus gaesatus Boucomont, 1925
Onthophagus praedatus Harold, 1862
Subgenus Eremonthophagus Zunino, 1979
Onthophagus abeillei Orbigny, 1897
Onthophagus heydeni Harold, 1875
Onthophagus infuscatus Klug, 1845
Onthophagus oberthueri Orbigny, 1898
Onthophagus semicinctus Orbigny, 1897
Onthophagus sticticus Harold, 1867
Onthophagus transcaspicus Koenig, 1889
Subgenus Exonthophagus Kabakov, 2006
Onthophagus haroldi Ballion, 1871
Onthophagus viriditinctus Reitter, 1892
Subgenus Furconthophagus Zunino, 1979

Onthophagus aethiopicus Orbigny, 1902
Onthophagus amicus (Gillet, 1925)
Onthophagus boucomonti Paulian, 1931
Onthophagus dapcauensis Boucomont, 1921
Onthophagus flaviclava Orbigny, 1902
Onthophagus frontalis Raffray, 1877
Onthophagus furcatoides Lansberge, 1886
Onthophagus furcatus (Fabricius, 1781)
Onthophagus karenensis Masumoto, Ochi & Hanboonsong, 2008
Onthophagus khonkaenus Masumoto, Ochi & Hanboonsong, 2008
Onthophagus lamelliger Gerstaecker, 1871
Onthophagus liwondeensis Josso, 2019
Onthophagus monforti Josso & Prévost, 2006
Onthophagus papulatorius Kabakov, 2008
Onthophagus papulatus Boucomont, 1914
Onthophagus parvulus (Fabricius, 1798)
Onthophagus promontorii Boucomont, 1924
Onthophagus rugulipennis Fairmaire, 1887
Onthophagus schoolmeestersi Ochi & Kon, 2007
Onthophagus sellatus Klug, 1845
Onthophagus shaykh Montanaro & Ziani, 2022
Onthophagus suffusus Klug, 1855
Onthophagus sugillatus Klug, 1855
Onthophagus troglodyta (Wiedemann, 1823)
Onthophagus ulula Balthasar, 1966
Onthophagus valentineae Josso, 2019
Onthophagus variegatus (Fabricius, 1798)
Onthophagus verae Josso, 2013
Onthophagus versutus Péringuey, 1901

Subgenus Gibbonthophagus Balthasar, 1935

Onthophagus amamiensis Nomura, 1965
Onthophagus apicetinctus Orbigny, 1898
Onthophagus asiaticus Endrödi, 1973
Onthophagus atripennis Waterhouse, 1875
Onthophagus balthasari Všetečka, 1939
Onthophagus bisscrutator Krikken & Huijbregts, 2017
Onthophagus cervicapra Boucomont, 1914
Onthophagus chineicus Kabakov, 1998
Onthophagus denticornis Boucomont, 1914
Onthophagus dubernardi Boucomont, 1914
Onthophagus duporti Boucomont, 1914
Onthophagus euryceros Kabakov, 1998
Onthophagus fujiii Ochi & Kon, 1995
Onthophagus hiabunicus Kabakov, 1998
Onthophagus incollaris Kabakov, 2008
Onthophagus kentingensis Nomura, 1973
Onthophagus kimioi Ochi, Kon & Kawahara, 2011
Onthophagus kiyoshii Ochi & Kon, 2007
Onthophagus laichauensis Ochi, Kon & Pham, 2021
Onthophagus lenis Kabakov, 1998
Onthophagus limbatus (Herbst, 1789)
Onthophagus luridipennis Boheman, 1858
Onthophagus nasalis Arrow, 1931
Onthophagus nigriobscurior Ochi, Kon & Tsubaki, 2009
Onthophagus obscurior Boucomont, 1914
Onthophagus palawanicus Ochi & Kon, 2004
Onthophagus parviobscurior Ochi, Kon & Tsubaki, 2009
Onthophagus penmani Masumoto, Ochi & Hanboonsong, 2002
Onthophagus privus Kabakov, 1998
Onthophagus proletarius Harold, 1875
Onthophagus quangnamensis Ochi, Kon & Pham, 2021
Onthophagus rectecornutus Lansberge, 1883
Onthophagus remotus Harold, 1879
Onthophagus rufiobscurior Ochi, Kon & Tsubaki, 2009
Onthophagus sasajii Ochi & Kon, 2001
Onthophagus schillhammeri Kabakov, 2006
Onthophagus scrutator Harold, 1877
Onthophagus semipersonatus Ochi, Kon & Tsubaki, 2009
Onthophagus solivagus Harold, 1886
Onthophagus subcornutus Boucomont, 1914
Onthophagus sunantaae Masumoto, 1989
Onthophagus susterai Balthasar, 1952
Onthophagus taeniatus Boucomont, 1914
Onthophagus taurinus White, 1844
Onthophagus viduus Harold, 1875
Onthophagus viridicervicapra Ochi, Kon & Tsubaki, 2009

Subgenus Gonocyphus Lansberge, 1885
Onthophagus obliquus (Olivier, 1789)
Onthophagus shimba Cambefort, 1980
Subgenus Hikidaeus Ochi & Kon, 2016

Onthophagus azusae Ochi & Kon, 2006
Onthophagus cupreopastillatus Ochi & Kon, 2006
Onthophagus kanyaayonus Masumoto, 1992
Onthophagus leknamnaous Masumoto & Ochi, 2015
Onthophagus pastillatus Boucomont, 1919
Onthophagus peninsularis Boucomont, 1914
Onthophagus sauteri Gillet, 1924
Onthophagus shirakii Nakane, 1960
Onthophagus simboroni Ochi & Kon, 2006
Onthophagus singhaakhomus Masumoto, 1992
Onthophagus tsutomui Ochi & Kon, 2016
Onthophagus yangmunensis Masumoto & Ochi, 2015

Subgenus Indachorius Balthasar, 1941

Onthophagus aereopictus Boucomont, 1914
Onthophagus arai Masumoto, 1989
Onthophagus baenzigeri Masumoto, Ochi & Hanboonsong, 2007
Onthophagus baykanus Kabakov, 1994
Onthophagus bonengus Kabakov, 1994
Onthophagus chetroiensis Masumoto, Ochi & Sakchoowong, 2012
Onthophagus cheyi Ochi & Kon, 2006
Onthophagus chinbucephalus Ochi & Kon, 2018
Onthophagus chinensis (Balthasar, 1952)
Onthophagus chumphonensis Masumoto, Ochi & Hanboonsong, 2008
Onthophagus clermonti Paulian, 1931
Onthophagus danumensis Ochi, Kon & Barclay, 2009
Onthophagus doisuthepensis Masumoto, 1989
Onthophagus heterorrhinus Lansberge, 1885
Onthophagus hikidai Ochi & Kon, 2006
Onthophagus hsui Masumoto, Chen & Ochi, 2004
Onthophagus jingping Masumoto, Ochi & Hanboonsong, 2007
Onthophagus koshunensis Balthasar, 1941
Onthophagus kyokoae Masumoto & Ochi, 2015
Onthophagus lamyi Paulian, 1945
Onthophagus lannamiibun Masumoto, Ochi & Hanboonsong, 2002
Onthophagus lekmaengtibanphrao Masumoto & Ochi, 2015
Onthophagus liwagensis Ochi & Kon, 2006
Onthophagus maephaluangus Masumoto, Ochi & Hanboonsong, 2007
Onthophagus maesaensis Masumoto, Ochi & Hanboonsong, 2002
Onthophagus magnini Paulian, 1933
Onthophagus maruchanus Masumoto, Ochi & Sakchoowong, 2012
Onthophagus maruyamai Ochi, Kon & Masumoto, 2014
Onthophagus masaoi Ochi, 1992
Onthophagus mendeli Ochi, Kon & Barclay, 2009
Onthophagus mongkhoni Masumoto, Hanboonsong & Ochi, 2002
Onthophagus namnaonus Masumoto, Ochi & Higurashi, 2020
Onthophagus nefarius Balthasar, 1963
Onthophagus nongkaiensis Masumoto, Ochi & Hanboonsong, 2002
Onthophagus octonaevus Kabakov, 1994
Onthophagus paramasaoi Ochi, Kon & Barclay, 2009
Onthophagus perakensis Ochi, Kon & Masumoto, 2014
Onthophagus phahompokus Masumoto & Ochi, 2015
Onthophagus phakuaiensis Masumoto, Ochi & Hanboonsong, 2013
Onthophagus phetchabunensis Masumoto, Ochi & Hanboonsong, 2002
Onthophagus phuquoci Paulian, 1945
Onthophagus platypus Zhang, 1997
Onthophagus pseudoarai Ochi & Kon, 2018
Onthophagus pseudoworoae Ochi, Kon & Barclay, 2009
Onthophagus pumilus Kabakov, 2014
Onthophagus ranongensis Masumoto, Ochi & Hanboonsong, 2008
Onthophagus sabai Masumoto, Ochi & Sakchoowong, 2012
Onthophagus scotti Masumoto, Ochi & Hanboonsong, 2002
Onthophagus semiaereopictus Ochi, Kawahara & Cabras, 2021
Onthophagus semidanumensis Ochi, Kon & Barclay, 2009
Onthophagus semiperakensis Ochi, Kon & Masumoto, 2014
Onthophagus semiworoae Ochi, Kon & Masumoto, 2014
Onthophagus spathatus Boucomont, 1914
Onthophagus subsapaensis Kabakov, 1994
Onthophagus suginoi Ochi, 1984
Onthophagus thungphraensis Masumoto, Ochi & Higurashi, 2020
Onthophagus tiamicus Kabakov, 1994
Onthophagus tongbantumi Masumoto, Ochi & Hanboonsong, 2002
Onthophagus trochilus Arrow, 1931
Onthophagus uedai Ochi & Kon, 2006
Onthophagus ulugombakensis Ochi, Kon & Masumoto, 2014
Onthophagus viridiperakensis Ochi, Kon & Masumoto, 2014
Onthophagus wangtaichieni Masumoto, Ochi & Higurashi, 2020
Onthophagus woroae Ochi & Kon, 2006
Onthophagus yaoi Masumoto, Ochi & Lee, 2014
Onthophagus yumotoi Ochi & Kon, 2006

Subgenus Indonthophagus Kabakov, 2006
Onthophagus ensifer Boucomont, 1914
Onthophagus hastifer Lansberge, 1885
Onthophagus mopsus (Fabricius, 1792)
Onthophagus nitidulus Klug, 1845
Onthophagus turbatus Walker, 1858
Subgenus Macronthophagus Ochi, 2003

Onthophagus cludtsi Ochi, 2003
Onthophagus curvicarinatus Boucomont, 1914
Onthophagus diabolicus Harold, 1877
Onthophagus manipurensis Arrow, 1907
Onthophagus menieri Ochi, 2003
Onthophagus nilgirensis Gillet, 1922
Onthophagus rubricollis Hope, 1831
Onthophagus shinichii Ochi & Kon, 2018
Onthophagus uenoi Ochi, 1995

Subgenus Matashia Matsumura, 1938

Onthophagus apomontanus Ochi, Kon & Cabras, 2023
Onthophagus fossor Arrow, 1931
Onthophagus galeatus Boucomont, 1919
Onthophagus gracilipes Boucomont, 1914
Onthophagus kuluensis Bates, 1891
Onthophagus lutosopictus Fairmaire, 1897
Onthophagus negrosensis Ochi, Kon & Cabras, 2023
Onthophagus ohbayashii Nomura, 1939
Onthophagus samarensis Ochi, Kon & Cabras, 2023
Onthophagus troniceki Balthasar, 1933
Onthophagus yubarinus Matsumura, 1937

Subgenus Micronthophagus Balthasar, 1963

Onthophagus arayai Ochi & Kon, 2007
Onthophagus cavia Boucomont, 1914
Onthophagus chinvigilans Ochi & Kon, 2018
Onthophagus collinsi Krikken & Huijbregts, 1987
Onthophagus depressipennis Cambefort, 1975
Onthophagus drescheri Paulian, 1939
Onthophagus falsivigilans Masumoto, 1995
Onthophagus fukuyamai Ochi, Kon & Ueda, 2018
Onthophagus gigantivigilans Masumoto, Hanboonsong & Ochi, 2002
Onthophagus gulo Arrow, 1931
Onthophagus hystrix Boucomont, 1914
Onthophagus incertus Orbigny, 1897
Onthophagus konoi Matsumura, 1938
Onthophagus liui Masumoto, Ochi & Lee, 2014
Onthophagus melanocephalus Klug, 1845
Onthophagus mogo Krikken & Huijbregts, 2008
Onthophagus ochreatus Orbigny, 1897
Onthophagus oculatus Arrow, 1931
Onthophagus paroculus Krikken & Huijbregts, 1987
Onthophagus phillippsorum Krikken & Huijbregts, 1987
Onthophagus rotundicollis Lansberge, 1883
Onthophagus setoculus Krikken & Huijbregts, 1987
Onthophagus sideki Krikken & Huijbregts, 1987
Onthophagus sinagai Krikken & Huijbregts, 2008
Onthophagus taoi Ochi & Kon, 2006
Onthophagus vanasseni Krikken & Huijbregts, 2008
Onthophagus vanderblomi Krikken & Huijbregts, 2008
Onthophagus vanofwegeni Krikken & Huijbregts, 2008
Onthophagus vigilans Boucomont, 1921
Onthophagus wangi Masumoto, Chen & Ochi, 2004
Onthophagus watuwila Krikken & Huijbregts, 2008

Subgenus Onthophagiellus Balthasar, 1935

Onthophagus abei Ochi & Kon, 2015
Onthophagus andonarensis Boucomont, 1914
Onthophagus andreji Prokofiev, 2014
Onthophagus crassicollis Boucomont, 1913
Onthophagus deliensis Lansberge, 1885
Onthophagus falculatus Boucomont, 1914
Onthophagus hanboonsongae Masumoto, Ochi & Higurashi, 2021
Onthophagus hidakai Ochi & Kon, 1995
Onthophagus inermivertex Boucomont, 1921
Onthophagus jugicola Orbigny, 1902
Onthophagus kangeanus Paulian, 1936
Onthophagus kapitensis Frey, 1971
Onthophagus kawaharai Ochi & Kon, 2007
Onthophagus kondaoensis Kabakov, 1994
Onthophagus millingeni Orbigny, 1898
Onthophagus opacifalculatus Ochi, Kon & Tsubaki, 2009
Onthophagus parafalculatus Ochi, Kon & Tsubaki, 2009
Onthophagus popovi Kabakov, 1983
Onthophagus solmani Stebnicka, 1975
Onthophagus suginokoichii Ochi & Kon, 2008
Onthophagus sumatramontanus Ochi & Kon, 2008
Onthophagus taiyaruensis Masumoto, 1977
Onthophagus thanwaakhomus Masumoto, 1992
Onthophagus tridentitibialis Ochi & Kon, 2008
Onthophagus unguiculatus Kabakov, 1994

Subgenus Onthophagus Latreille, 1802

Onthophagus abas Balthasar, 1946
Onthophagus abmisibilus Krikken & Huijbregts, 2012
Onthophagus abreui Arrow, 1931
Onthophagus abruptus Orbigny, 1913
Onthophagus absyrtus Balthasar, 1946
Onthophagus abyssinicus Gillet, 1925
Onthophagus academus Balthasar, 1946
Onthophagus acernorus Moctezuma, Hernández & Sánchez-Huerta, 2021
Onthophagus aceroides Krikken & Huijbregts, 2013
Onthophagus acerus Gillet, 1930
Onthophagus aciculatulus Blatchley, 1928
Onthophagus acrisius Balthasar, 1946
Onthophagus acuminatus Harold, 1880
Onthophagus adelaidae Hope, 1846
Onthophagus adelphus Gillet, 1930
Onthophagus admetus Balthasar, 1946
Onthophagus adornatus Orbigny, 1904
Onthophagus aegrotus Balthasar, 1967
Onthophagus aemulus Gillet, 1930
Onthophagus aeneoniger Orbigny, 1913
Onthophagus aeneopiceus Orbigny, 1902
Onthophagus aequepubens Orbigny, 1905
Onthophagus aereidorsis Orbigny, 1902
Onthophagus aeremicans Orbigny, 1904
Onthophagus aereomaculatus Boucomont, 1914
Onthophagus aerestriatus Orbigny, 1913
Onthophagus aeruginosus Roth, 1851
Onthophagus aesopus Lansberge, 1882
Onthophagus affinis Gillet, 1930
Onthophagus africanus Lansberge, 1886
Onthophagus agaricophilus Arrow, 1931
Onthophagus ahenicollis Orbigny, 1902
Onthophagus ahenomicans Orbigny, 1902
Onthophagus akamineae Moretto & Génier, 2020
Onthophagus akhaus Masumoto, Ochi & Hanboonsong, 2007
Onthophagus alaindrumonti Krikken & Huijbregts, 2012
Onthophagus alainmonforti Josso, 2022
Onthophagus albicomus Orbigny, 1908
Onthophagus albicornis (Palisot de Beauvois, 1805)
Onthophagus albipennis Péringuey, 1908
Onthophagus albipodex Orbigny, 1902
Onthophagus alfuricus Huijbregts & Krikken, 2012
Onthophagus aliceae Josso, 2019
Onthophagus alienus Frey, 1958
Onthophagus allojavanus Huijbregts & Krikken, 2011
Onthophagus alluaudi Orbigny, 1902
Onthophagus alluvius Howden & Cartwright, 1963
Onthophagus aloysiellus Zunino, 1977
Onthophagus alquirta Matthews, 1972
Onthophagus alternans Raffray, 1877
Onthophagus altilamina Orbigny, 1905
Onthophagus altivagans Howden & Génier, 2004
Onthophagus ambang Krikken & Huijbregts, 2011
Onthophagus amoenus Orbigny, 1908
Onthophagus amphicoma Boucomont, 1914
Onthophagus amphinasus Arrow, 1931
Onthophagus amphioxus Arrow, 1933
Onthophagus amplipennis Orbigny, 1905
Onthophagus amycoides Kabakov, 2014
Onthophagus anchommatus Lea, 1923
Onthophagus andersoni Howden & Gill, 1987
Onthophagus andrewesi Arrow, 1931
Onthophagus andrewsmithi Krikken & Huijbregts, 2012
Onthophagus androgynus Orbigny, 1905
Onthophagus anewtoni Howden & Génier, 2004
Onthophagus angolensis Paulian, 1937
Onthophagus angularis Orbigny, 1908
Onthophagus angulicornis Orbigny, 1908
Onthophagus anisocerus Erichson, 1842
Onthophagus annoyeri Moretto, 2010
Onthophagus annulopunctatus Krikken & Huijbregts, 2017
Onthophagus anogeissii Cambefort, 1984
Onthophagus anomalicollis Frey, 1973
Onthophagus anomalipes Orbigny, 1902
Onthophagus antecornutus Josso, 2019
Onthophagus antennalis Frey, 1961
Onthophagus anthracinus Harold, 1873
Onthophagus antillarum Arrow, 1903
Onthophagus antilocapra Balthasar, 1937
Onthophagus antoinei Walter, 1990
Onthophagus antoineianus Josso, 2022
Onthophagus aphodioides Lansberge, 1883
Onthophagus apiciosus Orbigny, 1902
Onthophagus apterus Matthews, 1972
Onthophagus apunneea Masumoto, Ochi & Hanboonsong, 2007
Onthophagus arboreus Arrow, 1931
Onthophagus arcifer Orbigny, 1904
Onthophagus areolatus Orbigny, 1905
Onthophagus arkoola Storey & Weir, 1990
Onthophagus arnetti Howden & Cartwright, 1963
Onthophagus arrilla Matthews, 1972
Onthophagus arunachalensis Biswas & Chatterjee, 1985
Onthophagus aschenborni Frey, 1975
Onthophagus ashanticola Frey, 1973
Onthophagus asimilis Péringuey, 1901
Onthophagus asper MacLeay, 1864
Onthophagus aspericeps Orbigny, 1908
Onthophagus aspericollis Lansberge, 1885
Onthophagus asperipennis Orbigny, 1902
Onthophagus aspernatus Orbigny, 1907
Onthophagus asperodorsatus Howden & Gill, 1993
Onthophagus asperulus Orbigny, 1905
Onthophagus astigma Orbigny, 1904
Onthophagus athiensis Orbigny, 1913
Onthophagus atricolor Orbigny, 1907
Onthophagus atridorsis Orbigny, 1902
Onthophagus atriglabrus Howden & Gill, 1987
Onthophagus atrofasciatus Orbigny, 1905
Onthophagus atronitidus Orbigny, 1902
Onthophagus atrosericeus Boucomont, 1932
Onthophagus atrosplendens Moretto, 2017
Onthophagus atrostriatus Orbigny, 1913
Onthophagus atrovirens Orbigny, 1905
Onthophagus atrox Harold, 1867
Onthophagus aureofuscus Bates, 1887
Onthophagus aureopilosus Boucomont, 1914
Onthophagus auritus Erichson, 1842
Onthophagus australis Guérin-Méneville, 1830 - (Southern Dung Beetle)
Onthophagus axillaris Boheman, 1860
Onthophagus aztecus Zunino & Halffter, 1988
Onthophagus babaulti Orbigny, 1915
Onthophagus babirussa (Eschscholtz, 1822)
Onthophagus baiyericus Krikken & Huijbregts, 2013
Onthophagus bajacalifornianus Moctezuma & Halffter, 2019
Onthophagus bakweri Moretto, 2014
Onthophagus balawaicus Scheuern, 1995
Onthophagus baloghi Balthasar, 1967
Onthophagus bambra Matthews, 1972
Onthophagus bandamai Cambefort, 1984
Onthophagus baoule Cambefort, 1984
Onthophagus barretti Génier & Howden, 1999
Onthophagus barriorum Walter, 1990
Onthophagus bartosi Balthasar, 1966
Onthophagus basakata Walter & Cambefort, 1977
Onthophagus basicarinatus Rossini, Vaz-de-Mello & Zunino, 2018
Onthophagus basilewskyi Frey, 1961
Onthophagus bassariscus Zunino & Halffter, 1988
Onthophagus bateke Walter & Cambefort, 1977
Onthophagus batesi Howden & Cartwright, 1963
Onthophagus batillifer Harold, 1875
Onthophagus batui Huijbregts & Krikken, 2009
Onthophagus bayeri Balthasar, 1942
Onthophagus bechynei Frey, 1953
Onthophagus beelarong Storey & Weir, 1990
Onthophagus beesoni Arrow, 1931
Onthophagus begoniophilus Krikken & Huijbregts, 2017
Onthophagus belinga Walter, 1989
Onthophagus belorhinus Bates, 1887
Onthophagus benedictorum Walter & Cambefort, 1977
Onthophagus bengali Gordon & Oppenheimer, 1977
Onthophagus benguellianus Paulian, 1937
Onthophagus bennigseni Paulian, 1937
Onthophagus bequaerti Orbigny, 1915
Onthophagus bergeri Frey, 1975
Onthophagus bernaudi Cambefort & Nicolas, 1991
Onthophagus betschuanus Frey, 1975
Onthophagus bicallifrons Orbigny, 1902
Onthophagus bicarinaticeps Lea, 1923
Onthophagus bicarinatus Gomes Alves, 1944
Onthophagus bicavicollis Lea, 1923
Onthophagus bicavifrons Orbigny, 1902
Onthophagus bicolensis Ochi & Kon, 2006
Onthophagus bicolor Raffray, 1877
Onthophagus biconifer Orbigny, 1905
Onthophagus bicristatus Orbigny, 1905
Onthophagus bicristiger Orbigny, 1913
Onthophagus bicuneus Kabakov, 2008
Onthophagus bidens (Olivier, 1789)
Onthophagus bidentatus Drapiez, 1819
Onthophagus bidentifrons Orbigny, 1902
Onthophagus bifidicornis Orbigny, 1902
Onthophagus bifidus Reiche, 1850
Onthophagus bifrons Orbigny, 1905
Onthophagus bilingula Balthasar, 1965
Onthophagus bimarginatus Orbigny, 1902
Onthophagus bindaree Storey & Weir, 1990
Onthophagus binodis (Thunberg, 1818) - (Humpbacked Dung Beetle)
Onthophagus binodosus Orbigny, 1908
Onthophagus binodulus Orbigny, 1913
Onthophagus binyana Storey & Weir, 1990
Onthophagus biplagiatus Thomson, 1858
Onthophagus birugatus Orbigny, 1902
Onthophagus birugifer Orbigny, 1908
Onthophagus bisbicornis Orbigny, 1909
Onthophagus biscarinulatus Huijbregts & Krikken, 2012
Onthophagus bisectus Arrow, 1931
Onthophagus bisignatus Orbigny, 1913
Onthophagus bistiniocelloides Krikken, 1986
Onthophagus bituberans Orbigny, 1905
Onthophagus bituberifrons Josso, 2018
Onthophagus bituberoculus Krikken & Huijbregts, 2013
Onthophagus bivertex Heyden, 1887
Onthophagus blackburni Shipp, 1895
Onthophagus blackwoodensis Blackburn, 1892
Onthophagus blanchardi Harold, 1869
Onthophagus bocandei Orbigny, 1904
Onthophagus bokiaunus Masumoto, 1995
Onthophagus bolivari Moctezuma, Rossini & Zunino, 2016
Onthophagus bomberaianus Balthasar, 1969
Onthophagus bongkudai Krikken & Huijbregts, 2017
Onthophagus bonorae Zunino, 1976
Onthophagus boops Orbigny, 1905
Onthophagus borassi Cambefort, 1984
Onthophagus bordati Moretto, 2014
Onthophagus borneensis Harold, 1877
Onthophagus bornemisszai Matthews, 1972
Onthophagus bornemisszanus Matthews, 1972
Onthophagus boucomontianus Balthasar, 1935
Onthophagus bourgognei Paulian, 1945
Onthophagus bovinus Péringuey, 1892
Onthophagus brachypterus Zunino & Halffter, 1997
Onthophagus brazzavillianus Balthasar, 1974
Onthophagus breviceps Orbigny, 1902
Onthophagus brevicollis Arrow, 1907
Onthophagus breviconus Génier & Howden, 1999
Onthophagus brevifrons Horn, 1881
Onthophagus brevigena Orbigny, 1902
Onthophagus brevipennis Orbigny, 1902
Onthophagus brevisetis Orbigny, 1915
Onthophagus brittoni Paulian, 1948
Onthophagus brivioi Frey, 1973
Onthophagus bronzeus Arrow, 1907
Onthophagus brooksi Matthews, 1972
Onthophagus browni Howden & Cartwright, 1963
Onthophagus brunellii Müller, 1942
Onthophagus brutus Arrow, 1931
Onthophagus buculus Mannerheim, 1828
Onthophagus bufonidius Josso, 2019
Onthophagus bufulus Arrow, 1941
Onthophagus bulga Reid & Runagall-McNaull, 2022
Onthophagus bunamin Matthews, 1972
Onthophagus bundara Storey & Weir, 1990
Onthophagus burchelli Orbigny, 1908
Onthophagus busiris Balthasar, 1969
Onthophagus caelator Balthasar, 1967
Onthophagus caesariatus Boucomont, 1921
Onthophagus calamophilus Krikken, 1977
Onthophagus calcaratus Boucomont, 1919
Onthophagus calchas Balthasar, 1967
Onthophagus calliger Orbigny, 1913
Onthophagus callosipennis Boucomont, 1930
Onthophagus cambrai Delgado & Curoe, 2014
Onthophagus camerunicus Orbigny, 1905
Onthophagus camilleae Josso, 2022
Onthophagus campestris Masumoto, Kiuchi & Ho, 2018
Onthophagus cancer Lansberge, 1886
Onthophagus canelasensis Howden & Génier, 2004
Onthophagus canescens Zunino & Halffter, 1988
Onthophagus capella Kirby, 1818
Onthophagus capelliformis Gillet, 1925
Onthophagus capellinus Frey, 1963
Onthophagus capitatus Castelnau, 1840
Onthophagus capitosus Harold, 1867
Onthophagus carayoni Cambefort, 1986
Onthophagus carcharias Harold, 1875
Onthophagus carinicollis Raffray, 1877
Onthophagus carinidorsis Orbigny, 1908
Onthophagus carinulatus Harold, 1877
Onthophagus carmodensis Blackburn, 1907
Onthophagus carpophilus Pereira & Halffter, 1961
Onthophagus cartwrighti Howden, 1973
Onthophagus castetsi Lansberge, 1887
Onthophagus catenatus Lansberge, 1883
Onthophagus catharinensis Paulian, 1936
Onthophagus catherineae Josso, 2022
Onthophagus cavernicollis Howden & Cartwright, 1963
Onthophagus caviceps Frey, 1962
Onthophagus cavifrons Harold, 1886
Onthophagus cavivertex Orbigny, 1913
Onthophagus centricornis (Fabricius, 1798)
Onthophagus centurio Lansberge, 1885
Onthophagus cephalophi Cambefort, 1984
Onthophagus cervus (Fabricius, 1798)
Onthophagus ceylonicus Harold, 1859
Onthophagus chacoensis Rossini, Vaz-de-Mello & Zunino, 2018
Onthophagus chaiyaphumensis Masumoto, Ochi & Hanboonsong, 2002
Onthophagus championi Bates, 1887
Onthophagus chebaicus Boucomont, 1919
Onthophagus cheesmanae Arrow, 1941
Onthophagus chepara Matthews, 1972
Onthophagus chevrolati Harold, 1869
Onthophagus chiangdaolekus Masumoto, Ochi & Higurashi, 2020
Onthophagus chiapanecus Zunino & Halffter, 1988
Onthophagus chilapensis Gasca-Álvarez, Zunino & Deloya, 2018
Onthophagus chimalapensis Delgado & Mora-Aguilar, 2019
Onthophagus chinantecus Moctezuma & Halffter, 2019
Onthophagus chirindaensis Josso, 2022
Onthophagus chirindanus Orbigny, 1913
Onthophagus chitipaensis Josso, 2019
Onthophagus chlorophanus Orbigny, 1902
Onthophagus choanicus Orbigny, 1904
Onthophagus chremes Balthasar, 1969
Onthophagus chryses Bates, 1887
Onthophagus chrysurus Arrow, 1931
Onthophagus cicer Balthasar, 1964
Onthophagus cincticollis Orbigny, 1902
Onthophagus cinctifrons Orbigny, 1902
Onthophagus cinctipennis Quedenfeldt, 1884
Onthophagus cineraceus Orbigny, 1902
Onthophagus circulator Reitter, 1891
Onthophagus circulifer Arrow, 1931
Onthophagus circumdatus Orbigny, 1913
Onthophagus citreum Boucomont, 1919
Onthophagus civettae Cambefort, 1984
Onthophagus civitasorum Moctezuma & Halffter, 2020
Onthophagus clavijeroi Moctezuma, Rossini & Zunino, 2016
Onthophagus clavisetis Orbigny, 1905
Onthophagus clitellarius Orbigny, 1908
Onthophagus clivimerus Huijbregts & Krikken, 2011
Onthophagus clusifrons Orbigny, 1905
Onthophagus clypealis Lea, 1923
Onthophagus clypeatus Blanchard, 1845
Onthophagus coahuilae Zunino & Halffter, 1988
Onthophagus cochisus Brown, 1927
Onthophagus coeruleicollis Arrow, 1907
Onthophagus cognatus Boucomont, 1921
Onthophagus coiffaiti Frey, 1970
Onthophagus colasi Paulian, 1937
Onthophagus colffsi Lansberge, 1883
Onthophagus collaris Kabakov, 1983
Onthophagus comatulus Orbigny, 1905
Onthophagus compactus Arrow, 1933
Onthophagus comperei Blackburn, 1903
Onthophagus compositus Lea, 1923
Onthophagus compressus Guérin-Méneville, 1855
Onthophagus concinnus Castelnau, 1840
Onthophagus confertus Péringuey, 1908
Onthophagus confluens Orbigny, 1902
Onthophagus confusus Boucomont, 1932
Onthophagus conradsi Balthasar, 1937
Onthophagus consentaneus Harold, 1867 - (Comon Northern Dung Beetle)
Onthophagus conspicuus MacLeay, 1864
Onthophagus contiguicornis Orbigny, 1913
Onthophagus contrapositus Génier, 2017
Onthophagus convexicollis Boheman, 1858
Onthophagus convexus Orbigny, 1908
Onthophagus cooloola Storey & Weir, 1990
Onthophagus coomani Paulian, 1931
Onthophagus coorgensis Arrow, 1931
Onthophagus coprimorphoides Huijbregts & Krikken, 2012
Onthophagus coprimorphus Gillet, 1930
Onthophagus coproides Horn, 1881
Onthophagus coptorhinodes Péringuey, 1901
Onthophagus coracinoides Kabakov, 1983
Onthophagus coracinus Boucomont, 1914
Onthophagus coriaceoumbrosus Kohlmann & Solis, 2001
Onthophagus corniculiger Orbigny, 1913
Onthophagus cornutus Ferreira, 1971
Onthophagus coronatus Orbigny, 1902
Onthophagus corrosus Bates, 1887
Onthophagus coscineus Bates, 1887
Onthophagus costatus Orbigny, 1913
Onthophagus costifer Gillet, 1930
Onthophagus costiger Orbigny, 1915
Onthophagus costilatus Orbigny, 1910
Onthophagus costulicollis Frey, 1975
Onthophagus crantor Balthasar, 1967
Onthophagus cratippus Balthasar, 1969
Onthophagus creber Orbigny, 1905
Onthophagus cretus Péringuey, 1901
Onthophagus cribellum Orbigny, 1902
Onthophagus cribratus Lansberge, 1883
Onthophagus cribripennis Orbigny, 1902
Onthophagus criniger Orbigny, 1904
Onthophagus crinitus Harold, 1869
Onthophagus cristatus Orbigny, 1905
Onthophagus croesulus Bates, 1888
Onthophagus crotchi Harold, 1871
Onthophagus crucenotatus Orbigny, 1905
Onthophagus cruciger MacLeay, 1888
Onthophagus cruentatus Klug, 1855
Onthophagus cryptodicranius Kohlmann & Solis, 2001
Onthophagus cryptogenus Boucomont, 1914
Onthophagus cuboidalis Bates, 1887
Onthophagus cuevensis Howden, 1973
Onthophagus cuneus Boucomont, 1924
Onthophagus cuniculus MacLeay, 1864
Onthophagus cupreopinguis Josso, 2022
Onthophagus cupreovirens Orbigny, 1904
Onthophagus cupreus Harold, 1880
Onthophagus cupricollis Péringuey, 1888
Onthophagus curtulus Frey, 1961
Onthophagus curvicornis Latreille, 1812
Onthophagus curvifrons Orbigny, 1906
Onthophagus curvilamina Müller, 1942
Onthophagus curvispina Reitter, 1892
Onthophagus cyaneiceps Orbigny, 1913
Onthophagus cyanellus Bates, 1887
Onthophagus cyaneoniger Orbigny, 1902
Onthophagus cyanochlorus Orbigny, 1902
Onthophagus cyclographus Bates, 1887
Onthophagus cynomysi Brown, 1927
Onthophagus cyobioides Boucomont, 1921
Onthophagus dandalu Matthews, 1972
Onthophagus danumicus Huijbregts & Krikken, 2012
Onthophagus dapitanensis Boucomont, 1919
Onthophagus darlingtoni Matthews, 1972
Onthophagus davisi Frey, 1975
Onthophagus dayacus Boucomont, 1914
Onthophagus daymanus Krikken & Huijbregts, 2013
Onthophagus debilis Orbigny, 1905
Onthophagus deccanensis Frey, 1962
Onthophagus decedens Péringuey, 1904
Onthophagus decens Balthasar, 1964
Onthophagus declivicollis Orbigny, 1902
Onthophagus declivis Harold, 1869
Onthophagus decolor Orbigny, 1902
Onthophagus decoratus Orbigny, 1905
Onthophagus dedecor Wallengren, 1881
Onthophagus deflexicollis Lansberge, 1883
Onthophagus deflexus Orbigny, 1908
Onthophagus delicatulus Raffray, 1877
Onthophagus delicatus Orbigny, 1915
Onthophagus delphinensis Orbigny, 1913
Onthophagus demarzi Frey, 1959
Onthophagus densatus Frey, 1963
Onthophagus densepunctatus Frey, 1963
Onthophagus densipilis Orbigny, 1902
Onthophagus denticollis Lansberge, 1883
Onthophagus denticulatus Orbigny, 1902
Onthophagus denudatus Orbigny, 1902
Onthophagus depilatus Orbigny, 1913
Onthophagus depilis Orbigny, 1902
Onthophagus deplanatus Lansberge, 1883
Onthophagus depressicollis Boucomont, 1914
Onthophagus depressifrons Orbigny, 1915
Onthophagus derasus Orbigny, 1902
Onthophagus desaegeri Frey, 1961
Onthophagus desectus MacLeay, 1871
Onthophagus deterrens Péringuey, 1901
Onthophagus devagiriensis Schoolmeesters & Thomas, 2006
Onthophagus devexicornis Gillet, 1930
Onthophagus devexus MacLeay, 1888
Onthophagus dhanjuricus Frey, 1973
Onthophagus diadematus Orbigny, 1902
Onthophagus dicax Balthasar, 1966
Onthophagus dicella Bates, 1888
Onthophagus dicranius Bates, 1887
Onthophagus dicranocerus Gillet, 1925
Onthophagus dicranoides Balthasar, 1939
Onthophagus difficilis Le Guillou, 1844
Onthophagus digitifer Boucomont, 1932
Onthophagus dignus Gillet, 1930
Onthophagus dilutus Orbigny, 1905
Onthophagus dinjeera Storey & Weir, 1990
Onthophagus dinoderus Orbigny, 1913
Onthophagus discolor Hope, 1841
Onthophagus discovirens Orbigny, 1902
Onthophagus discretus Péringuey, 1901
Onthophagus dissentaneus Balthasar, 1964
Onthophagus dissidentatus Krikken & Huijbregts, 2013
Onthophagus distichus Roth, 1851
Onthophagus ditus Péringuey, 1901
Onthophagus diversus Reiche, 1850
Onthophagus dlabolai Balthasar, 1964
Onthophagus dohertyi Orbigny, 1902
Onthophagus doiinthanonensis Masumoto, 1989
Onthophagus doipuiensis Masumoto, 1989
Onthophagus doitungensis Masumoto, Ochi & Hanboonsong, 2002
Onthophagus doriae Harold, 1877
Onthophagus dorsipilulus Howden & Gill, 1987
Onthophagus dorsuosus Orbigny, 1902
Onthophagus drumonti Moretto & Génier, 2020
Onthophagus dryander Monteith & Storey, 2013
Onthophagus dubitabilis Howden & Génier, 2004
Onthophagus duboulayi Waterhouse, 1894
Onthophagus ducorpsi Orbigny, 1913
Onthophagus dudleyianus Josso, 2019
Onthophagus dummal Matthews, 1972
Onthophagus dunningi Harold, 1869
Onthophagus durangoensis Balthasar, 1939
Onthophagus duvivieri Orbigny, 1904
Onthophagus ebenicolor Orbigny, 1902
Onthophagus eburneus Orbigny, 1913
Onthophagus echinus Boucomont, 1914
Onthophagus ecopas Josso & Prévost, 2006
Onthophagus egenus Harold, 1877
Onthophagus elegans Klug, 1834
Onthophagus eliptaminus Balthasar, 1969
Onthophagus elongatus Frey, 1954
Onthophagus embersoni Masumoto, Hanboonsong & Ochi, 2002
Onthophagus embrikianus Paulian, 1936
Onthophagus endota Matthews, 1972
Onthophagus endroedianus Walter & Cambefort, 1977
Onthophagus enuguensis Frey, 1975
Onthophagus epilamprus Bates, 1888
Onthophagus erectinasus Orbigny, 1902
Onthophagus erichsoni Hope, 1841
Onthophagus escalerai Orbigny, 1902
Onthophagus eschscholtzi Boucomont, 1924
Onthophagus estelleae Josso, 2022
Onthophagus etlaensis Kohlmann, Escobar-Hernández & Arriaga-Jiménez, 2019
Onthophagus eulophus Bates, 1887
Onthophagus euzeti Walter & Cambefort, 1977
Onthophagus evae Balthasar, 1944
Onthophagus evanidus Harold, 1869
Onthophagus exasperatus Gerstaecker, 1871
Onthophagus excisiceps Orbigny, 1902
Onthophagus exiguus Raffray, 1877
Onthophagus exilis Orbigny, 1913
Onthophagus expansicornis Bates, 1891
Onthophagus exquisitus Arrow, 1931
Onthophagus extensicollis Orbigny, 1907
Onthophagus extraneus Josso, 2021
Onthophagus fabricianus Goidanich, 1926
Onthophagus fabricii Waterhouse, 1894
Onthophagus falcarius Balthasar, 1966
Onthophagus falcifer Harold, 1880
Onthophagus fallaciosus Raffray, 1877
Onthophagus falsus Gillet, 1925
Onthophagus fasciatus Boucomont, 1914
Onthophagus fasciculiger Orbigny, 1902
Onthophagus fasciolatus Boucomont, 1924
Onthophagus favrei Boucomont, 1914
Onthophagus feai Orbigny, 1905
Onthophagus felix Arrow, 1931
Onthophagus ferox Harold, 1867 - (Western Dung Beetle)
Onthophagus ferrari Matthews, 1972
Onthophagus filicornis Harold, 1873
Onthophagus fimetarius Roth, 1851
Onthophagus fissiceps MacLeay, 1888
Onthophagus fitiniensis Cambefort, 1984
Onthophagus flavibasis Orbigny, 1904
Onthophagus flavicornis Germar, 1823
Onthophagus flavipennis Orbigny, 1905
Onthophagus flavoapicalis Lea, 1923
Onthophagus flavocinctus Frey, 1975
Onthophagus flavolimbatus Klug, 1855
Onthophagus flavomaculatus Gillet, 1930
Onthophagus flavorufus Orbigny, 1904
Onthophagus fletcheri Blackburn, 1903
Onthophagus flexifrons Orbigny, 1908
Onthophagus foedus Boucomont, 1914
Onthophagus foliaceus Lansberge, 1886 - (Scarab beetle)
Onthophagus foliiceps Quedenfeldt, 1884
Onthophagus foraminosus Orbigny, 1902
Onthophagus fossibasis Orbigny, 1910
Onthophagus fossifrons Orbigny, 1902
Onthophagus fossulatus Orbigny, 1908
Onthophagus foulliouxi Cambefort, 1971
Onthophagus foveatus Frey, 1957
Onthophagus foveicollis Boucomont, 1930
Onthophagus fradei Gomes Alves, 1956
Onthophagus fragosus Génier & Howden, 2014
Onthophagus francoisgenieri Krikken & Huijbregts, 2012
Onthophagus francoisi Josso, 2013
Onthophagus frankenbergeri Balthasar, 1933
Onthophagus frankrozendaali Huijbregts & Krikken, 2012
Onthophagus frenchi Blackburn, 1903
Onthophagus fritschi Orbigny, 1902
Onthophagus froggattellus Monteith & Rossini, 2017
Onthophagus fugitivus Péringuey, 1901
Onthophagus fuliginosus Erichson, 1842
Onthophagus fulvocinctus Orbigny, 1902
Onthophagus fulvus Sharp, 1875
Onthophagus funestus Moretto & Génier, 2010
Onthophagus fungicola Orbigny, 1908
Onthophagus fungus Josso, 2022
Onthophagus furcaticeps Masters, 1886
Onthophagus furcicollis Arrow, 1931
Onthophagus furcillifer Bates, 1891
Onthophagus furculifer Orbigny, 1905
Onthophagus furculus (Fabricius, 1798)
Onthophagus fuscatus Orbigny, 1908
Onthophagus fuscidorsis Orbigny, 1902
Onthophagus fuscivestis Orbigny, 1902
Onthophagus fuscopunctatus (Fabricius, 1798)
Onthophagus fuscostriatus Boucomont, 1914
Onthophagus fuscus Boucomont, 1932
Onthophagus gabonensis Walter, 1989
Onthophagus gagatinus Gillet, 1930
Onthophagus gaillardi Orbigny, 1911
Onthophagus gajo Krikken, 1977
Onthophagus ganalensis Gestro, 1895
Onthophagus gandju Matthews, 1972
Onthophagus gangeticus Gillet, 1925
Onthophagus gangulu Matthews, 1972
Onthophagus garambae Frey, 1961
Onthophagus gazellinus Bates, 1887
Onthophagus geelongensis Blackburn, 1892
Onthophagus gemellatus Raffray, 1877
Onthophagus geminatus Orbigny, 1907
Onthophagus geminifrons Orbigny, 1905
Onthophagus gemma (Sharp, 1875)
Onthophagus genuinus Kohlmann & Solis, 2001
Onthophagus georgwerneri Josso, 2022
Onthophagus germanus Gillet, 1927
Onthophagus geryon Balthasar, 1969
Onthophagus gestroi Harold, 1877
Onthophagus ghanensis Balthasar, 1966
Onthophagus gibbidorsis Orbigny, 1902
Onthophagus gibbifrons Orbigny, 1902
Onthophagus gibbus Orbigny, 1913
Onthophagus gibsoni Howden & Génier, 2004
Onthophagus gidju Matthews, 1972
Onthophagus gilli Delgado & Howden, 2000
Onthophagus giraffa (Hausmann, 1807)
Onthophagus girardinae Walter, 1989
Onthophagus giuseppecarpanetoi Tagliaferri & Moretto, 2012
Onthophagus glabratus Hope, 1841
Onthophagus glaucinus Gillet, 1930
Onthophagus gnu Frey, 1955
Onthophagus godarra Storey & Weir, 1990
Onthophagus gonipa Krikken & Huijbregts, 2011
Onthophagus gonopygus Orbigny, 1902
Onthophagus gonzaloi Moctezuma, Hernández & Sánchez-Huerta, 2022
Onthophagus gorochovi Kabakov, 1998
Onthophagus gorokae Paulian, 1972
Onthophagus gothicus Gillet, 1930
Onthophagus grandidorsis Orbigny, 1913
Onthophagus grandifrons Orbigny, 1907
Onthophagus grandivigilans Masumoto, 1995
Onthophagus graniceps Orbigny, 1908
Onthophagus granosus Orbigny, 1913
Onthophagus granulatus Boheman, 1858 - (Granulose Dung Beetle)
Onthophagus granulifer Harold, 1886
Onthophagus granulifrons Frey, 1961
Onthophagus granulum Orbigny, 1904
Onthophagus granum Lansberge, 1885
Onthophagus grassei Walter, 1989
Onthophagus grataehelenae Kohlmann & Solis, 2001
Onthophagus gratus Arrow, 1931
Onthophagus gravearmatus Balthasar, 1944
Onthophagus gravis Walker, 1858
Onthophagus gravoti Orbigny, 1908
Onthophagus griseoaeneus Lansberge, 1885
Onthophagus griseosetosus Arrow, 1931
Onthophagus guatemalensis Bates, 1887
Onthophagus gulmarri Matthews, 1972
Onthophagus gurburra Storey & Weir, 1990
Onthophagus guttatus Boheman, 1860
Onthophagus guttiger Orbigny, 1905
Onthophagus haafi Frey, 1963
Onthophagus haagi Harold, 1867
Onthophagus haematopus Harold, 1875
Onthophagus hageni Lansberge, 1883
Onthophagus hagenmontis Krikken & Huijbregts, 2012
Onthophagus hajimei Masumoto, 1984
Onthophagus halffteri Zunino, 1981
Onthophagus hamaticeps Arrow, 1931
Onthophagus hamaticornis Gillet, 1930
Onthophagus hartiniae Ochi & Kon, 2009
Onthophagus hayashii Masumoto, 1991
Onthophagus hecate (Panzer, 1794)
Onthophagus helciatus Harold, 1871
Onthophagus hemichalceus Orbigny, 1915
Onthophagus hemipygus Frey, 1964
Onthophagus hericiniformis Moretto, 2010
Onthophagus hericius Orbigny, 1908
Onthophagus herus Péringuey, 1901
Onthophagus heteroclitus Orbigny, 1911
Onthophagus heurni Gillet, 1930
Onthophagus heyrovskyi Všetečka, 1943
Onthophagus hidalgus Zunino & Halffter, 1988
Onthophagus hielkemai Krikken & Huijbregts, 2011
Onthophagus hilaridis Cambefort, 1984
Onthophagus hilaris Orbigny, 1905
Onthophagus hildebrandti Harold, 1878
Onthophagus hippopotamus Harold, 1869
Onthophagus hircus Billberg, 1815
Onthophagus hirsutulus Lansberge, 1883
Onthophagus hirsutus Orbigny, 1902
Onthophagus hirtellus Frey, 1957
Onthophagus hirticulus Orbigny, 1915
Onthophagus hirtipodex Orbigny, 1904
Onthophagus hirtuosus Gillet, 1930
Onthophagus histeriformis Boucomont, 1914
Onthophagus histrio Orbigny, 1902
Onthophagus hoberlandti Balthasar, 1966
Onthophagus hoepfneri Harold, 1869
Onthophagus hollowayi Krikken & Huijbregts, 2017
Onthophagus holosericus Harold, 1877
Onthophagus holzi Boucomont, 1914
Onthophagus hoogstraali Saylor, 1943
Onthophagus hoplocerus Lea, 1923
Onthophagus hoplothorax Gillet, 1930
Onthophagus horii Ochi, Kon & Tsubaki, 2009
Onthophagus horrens Orbigny, 1908
Onthophagus horribilis Balthasar, 1969
Onthophagus horridus Orbigny, 1908
Onthophagus hosomai Ochi & Kon, 2014
Onthophagus howdeni Zunino & Halffter, 1988
Onthophagus howdenorum Zunino & Halffter, 1988
Onthophagus hulstaerti Boucomont, 1932
Onthophagus humboldti Kohlmann, Solis & Alvarado, 2019
Onthophagus humpatensis Lansberge, 1886
Onthophagus hyaena (Fabricius, 1801)
Onthophagus ibex (Fabricius, 1792)
Onthophagus ieti Cambefort, 1984
Onthophagus ifugaoensis Ochi & Kon, 2006
Onthophagus igualensis Bates, 1887
Onthophagus ikelengeensis Josso, 2018
Onthophagus illotus Péringuey, 1901
Onthophagus illyricus (Scopoli, 1763)
Onthophagus imberbis Orbigny, 1902
Onthophagus imbutus Sharp, 1875
Onthophagus immundus Boheman, 1858
Onthophagus importunus Péringuey, 1901
Onthophagus impressicollis Boheman, 1860
Onthophagus impunctatus Orbigny, 1904
Onthophagus impurus Harold, 1868
Onthophagus inaequalis Orbigny, 1902
Onthophagus incantatus Balthasar, 1967
Onthophagus incanus MacLeay, 1888
Onthophagus incensus Say, 1835 - (Scarab beetle)
Onthophagus incisus Harold, 1877
Onthophagus includens Orbigny, 1905
Onthophagus inclusus Orbigny, 1905
Onthophagus incornutus MacLeay, 1871
Onthophagus indigus Péringuey, 1901
Onthophagus indosinicus Boucomont, 1921
Onthophagus indutus Orbigny, 1902
Onthophagus inecolorum Moctezuma & Halffter, 2020
Onthophagus inediapterus Kohlmann & Solis, 2001
Onthophagus ineptus Harold, 1871
Onthophagus inermiceps Orbigny, 1905
Onthophagus inermicollis Orbigny, 1908
Onthophagus infaustus Cambefort, 1984
Onthophagus inflaticollis Bates, 1889
Onthophagus inflatus Walter & Cambefort, 1977
Onthophagus infucatus Harold, 1877
Onthophagus insignis Péringuey, 1896
Onthophagus insularis Boheman, 1858
Onthophagus insulindicus Boucomont, 1914
Onthophagus insulsus Péringuey, 1901
Onthophagus intermixtus Orbigny, 1902
Onthophagus interruptus Raffray, 1877
Onthophagus interstitialis Fåhraeus, 1857
Onthophagus intonsus Orbigny, 1913
Onthophagus intricatus Moretto, 2010
Onthophagus investigator Lansberge, 1885
Onthophagus investis Orbigny, 1904
Onthophagus iodiellus Bates, 1887
Onthophagus ioramaculatus Krikken & Huijbregts, 2012
Onthophagus ioranus Krikken & Huijbregts, 2012
Onthophagus irianus Balthasar, 1969
Onthophagus iris Sharp, 1875
Onthophagus isanus Masumoto, Ochi & Hanboonsong, 2008
Onthophagus ishiii Ochi & Kon, 1995
Onthophagus istmenus Moctezuma, Sánchez-Huerta & Halffter, 2020
Onthophagus itonoborui Masumoto, Ochi & Sakchoowong, 2012
Onthophagus iulicola Cambefort, 1984
Onthophagus iumienus Masumoto, Ochi & Hanboonsong, 2007
Onthophagus ixtepecorum Moctezuma & Halffter, 2020
Onthophagus ixtlanensis Moctezuma & Halffter, 2020
Onthophagus iyengari Arrow, 1931
Onthophagus jacksoni Orbigny, 1913
Onthophagus jacobeus Boucomont, 1924
Onthophagus jalamari Matthews, 1972
Onthophagus jalapensis Balthasar, 1939
Onthophagus jaliscensis Zunino & Halffter, 1988
Onthophagus jangga Matthews, 1972
Onthophagus janssensi Frey, 1958
Onthophagus janthinus Harold, 1875
Onthophagus javaecola Balthasar, 1959
Onthophagus javanensis Balthasar, 1963
Onthophagus javanoides Huijbregts & Krikken, 2011
Onthophagus jocquei Josso, 2019
Onthophagus joliveti Paulian, 1972
Onthophagus jonathani Moretto & Génier, 2020
Onthophagus jubatus Harold, 1869
Onthophagus juheli Josso, 2022
Onthophagus juncticornis Orbigny, 1908
Onthophagus juniperensis Josso, 2019
Onthophagus justei Walter, 1989
Onthophagus jwalae Karimbumkara & Priyadarsanan, 2016
Onthophagus kachinicus Kabakov, 2006
Onthophagus kakadu Storey & Weir, 1990
Onthophagus kanarensis Arrow, 1931
Onthophagus kaomaensis Josso, 2022
Onthophagus kaosoidowensis Masumoto, Ochi & Hanboonsong, 2008
Onthophagus kapuri Endrödi, 1974
Onthophagus karlwerneri Josso, 2022
Onthophagus kashizakii Kon & Ochi, 2005
Onthophagus kashmirensis Balthasar, 1966
Onthophagus kassaicus Orbigny, 1908
Onthophagus katangensis Frey, 1961
Onthophagus kavirondus Orbigny, 1915
Onthophagus kchatriya Boucomont, 1914
Onthophagus keikoae Ochi & Kon, 2014
Onthophagus keiseri Frey, 1956
Onthophagus keralensis Frey, 1975
Onthophagus keralicus Biswas & Chatterjee, 1986
Onthophagus kiambram Storey, 1977
Onthophagus kindianus Frey, 1953
Onthophagus kingstoni Cambefort, 1980
Onthophagus kinhthaicus Kabakov, 1998
Onthophagus kirki Frey, 1975
Onthophagus kirokanus Frey, 1975
Onthophagus kiuchii Masumoto, 1995
Onthophagus kivuensis Walter, 2018
Onthophagus kleinei Balthasar, 1935
Onthophagus knapperti Krikken, 1981
Onthophagus knausi Brown, 1927
Onthophagus koebelei Blackburn, 1903
Onthophagus koechlei Masumoto, Ochi & Kon, 2011
Onthophagus kohlmanni Génier, 2017
Onthophagus kokereka Matthews, 1972
Onthophagus kokocellosus Krikken & Huijbregts, 2013
Onthophagus kokodanus Krikken & Huijbregts, 2012
Onthophagus kokodentatus Krikken & Huijbregts, 2013
Onthophagus kokoiorus Krikken & Huijbregts, 2012
Onthophagus kokopygus Krikken & Huijbregts, 2013
Onthophagus kokosquamatus Krikken & Huijbregts, 2012
Onthophagus kolaka Huijbregts & Krikken, 2009
Onthophagus koma Matsumura, 1937
Onthophagus komareki Balthasar, 1935
Onthophagus kongkaewensis Masumoto, Ochi & Sakchoowong, 2012
Onthophagus konsarnensis Masumoto, Ochi & Hanboonsong, 2008
Onthophagus kontumicus Kabakov, 1983
Onthophagus kora Storey, 1977
Onthophagus kouassii Cambefort, 1984
Onthophagus kraatzeanus Lansberge, 1883
Onthophagus krakadaakhomus Masumoto, 1992
Onthophagus kudrnaianus Josso, 2022
Onthophagus kukali Krikken & Huijbregts, 2013
Onthophagus kulti Balthasar, 1952
Onthophagus kulzeri Frey, 1958
Onthophagus kumaonensis Arrow, 1931
Onthophagus kumbaingeri Matthews, 1972
Onthophagus kyleensis Frey, 1975
Onthophagus labdacus Balthasar, 1969
Onthophagus laborans Arrow, 1931
Onthophagus lacustris Harold, 1877
Onthophagus laetus Orbigny, 1913
Onthophagus laeviceps Orbigny, 1902
Onthophagus laevidorsis Orbigny, 1907
Onthophagus laevigatus (Fabricius, 1798)
Onthophagus laevissimus Orbigny, 1905
Onthophagus lagnyi Paulian, 1937
Onthophagus lamellicornis Frey, 1953
Onthophagus lamgalio Matthews, 1972
Onthophagus laminatus MacLeay, 1864
Onthophagus laminicornis Lansberge, 1886
Onthophagus laminidorsis Orbigny, 1902
Onthophagus laminosus Orbigny, 1905
Onthophagus lamnifer Orbigny, 1902
Onthophagus lamotellus Cambefort, 1980
Onthophagus lamottei Frey, 1962
Onthophagus lamtoi Cambefort, 1980
Onthophagus landolti Harold, 1880
Onthophagus langkawiensis Ochi & Kon, 2015
Onthophagus lapillus Arrow, 1931
Onthophagus laratinus Arrow, 1916
Onthophagus lassulus Balthasar, 1964
Onthophagus latenasutus Arrow, 1941
Onthophagus latepunctatus Orbigny, 1913
Onthophagus latevittatus Orbigny, 1905
Onthophagus latigibber Orbigny, 1902
Onthophagus latipennis Orbigny, 1897
Onthophagus latissimus Orbigny, 1902
Onthophagus latro Harold, 1877
Onthophagus leai Blackburn, 1895
Onthophagus leanus Goidanich, 1926
Onthophagus lebasi Boucomont, 1932
Onthophagus lecontei Harold, 1871
Onthophagus lefebvrei Orbigny, 1913
Onthophagus lefiniensis Balthasar, 1967
Onthophagus legendrei Walter & Cambefort, 1977
Onthophagus leichhardti Monteith & Storey, 2013
Onthophagus lemagneni Orbigny, 1902
Onthophagus lemekensis Orbigny, 1915
Onthophagus lemniscatus Gillet, 1924
Onthophagus leomontanus Boucomont, 1914
Onthophagus leroyi Orbigny, 1902
Onthophagus leucopygus Harold, 1867
Onthophagus leusermontis Huijbregts & Krikken, 2011
Onthophagus limonensis Kohlmann & Solis, 2001
Onthophagus lindaae Masumoto, 1989
Onthophagus lindu Huijbregts & Krikken, 2009
Onthophagus liodermus Orbigny, 1913
Onthophagus lioides Orbigny, 1902
Onthophagus liopterus Harold, 1880
Onthophagus liothorax Koshantschikov, 1894
Onthophagus lituratus Roth, 1851
Onthophagus lobi Cambefort, 1984
Onthophagus lojanus Balthasar, 1939
Onthophagus lomii Müller, 1942
Onthophagus longecarinatus Zunino & Halffter, 1988
Onthophagus longegranus Frey, 1957
Onthophagus longiceps Orbigny, 1904
Onthophagus longimanus Bates, 1887
Onthophagus longipes Paulian, 1937
Onthophagus longipilis Orbigny, 1905
Onthophagus lopeensis Josso, 2022
Onthophagus lore Huijbregts & Krikken, 2009
Onthophagus lorianus Gillet, 1930
Onthophagus loroi Balthasar, 1941
Onthophagus loudetiae Cambefort, 1984
Onthophagus loxodontae Cambefort, 1984
Onthophagus luctuosus Boucomont, 1914
Onthophagus ludicrus Balthasar, 1969
Onthophagus ludio Boucomont, 1914
Onthophagus lugens Fåhraeus, 1857
Onthophagus lugubris Fåhraeus, 1857
Onthophagus luismargaritorum Delgado, 1995
Onthophagus lumareti Walter & Cambefort, 1977
Onthophagus lunulifer Boucomont, 1914
Onthophagus lutaticollis Orbigny, 1907
Onthophagus luteosignatus Lansberge, 1883
Onthophagus luzonwallacei Ochi, Kawahara & Cabras, 2021
Onthophagus mabuensis Daniel, Strümpher & Josso, 2023
Onthophagus macleayi Blackburn, 1903
Onthophagus macrocephalus Kirby, 1818
Onthophagus macrothorax Orbigny, 1902
Onthophagus maculosipennis Gillet, 1930
Onthophagus maculosus Orbigny, 1908
Onthophagus madoqua Arrow, 1931
Onthophagus magnioculus Ochi & Kon, 2006
Onthophagus magnipygus Boucomont, 1914
Onthophagus makokou Walter, 1989
Onthophagus malabarensis Boucomont, 1919
Onthophagus malangensis Boucomont, 1914
Onthophagus malasiacus Gillet, 1927
Onthophagus maleengnaafon Masumoto, 1990
Onthophagus maleengnoi Masumoto, 1990
Onthophagus malevolus Balthasar, 1964
Onthophagus malthinus Gillet, 1930
Onthophagus mamillatus Lea, 1923
Onthophagus manantlanensis Sánchez-Huerta, Moctezuma & Hernández, 2021
Onthophagus manguliensis Boucomont, 1914
Onthophagus maniti Masumoto, 1989
Onthophagus mankonoensis Balthasar, 1966
Onthophagus manya Matthews, 1972
Onthophagus marahouensis Cambefort, 1984
Onthophagus margaretensis Blackburn, 1903
Onthophagus margaritifer Orbigny, 1898
Onthophagus marginatus Castelnau, 1840
Onthophagus marginicollis Harold, 1880
Onthophagus marginifer Frey, 1953
Onthophagus marginipennis Josso, 2018
Onthophagus mariozuninoi Delgado, Navarrete & Blackaller-Bages, 1993
Onthophagus marshalli Orbigny, 1908
Onthophagus martellii Frey, 1972
Onthophagus martialis Boucomont, 1914
Onthophagus martinpierai Moctezuma, Rossini & Zunino, 2016
Onthophagus masaicus Orbigny, 1905
Onthophagus masumotoi Ochi, 1985
Onthophagus matae Cambefort, 1984
Onthophagus matanyo Huijbregts & Krikken, 2009
Onthophagus mateui Moctezuma & Halffter, 2020
Onthophagus matsudai Ochi & Kon, 2004
Onthophagus matsuii Ochi & Kon, 2006
Onthophagus mauritii Boucomont, 1919
Onthophagus maxwellianus Moretto, 2013
Onthophagus maya Zunino, 1981
Onthophagus mayeri Harold, 1876
Onthophagus mcclevei Howden & Génier, 2004
Onthophagus medorensis Brown, 1929
Onthophagus megapacificus Ochi & Kon, 2006
Onthophagus megathorax Gillet, 1921
Onthophagus mekara Huijbregts & Krikken, 2009
Onthophagus mendicus Gillet, 1924
Onthophagus menkaoensis Walter & Cambefort, 1977
Onthophagus merdrignaci Walter & Cambefort, 1977
Onthophagus meruanus Orbigny, 1910
Onthophagus merus Péringuey, 1901
Onthophagus metalliger Orbigny, 1913
Onthophagus mexicanus Bates, 1887
Onthophagus mextexus Howden & Cartwright, 1970
Onthophagus micropterus Zunino & Halffter, 1981
Onthophagus micros Orbigny, 1902
Onthophagus mije Storey & Weir, 1990
Onthophagus miles Orbigny, 1905
Onthophagus militaris Boucomont, 1914
Onthophagus millamilla Matthews, 1972
Onthophagus mimikanus Balthasar, 1969
Onthophagus mimus Orbigny, 1913
Onthophagus minettianus Josso, 2019
Onthophagus minotaurus Arrow, 1941
Onthophagus minutissimus Orbigny, 1908
Onthophagus minutulus Harold, 1875
Onthophagus minutus (Hausmann, 1807)
Onthophagus mirabilis Bates, 1887
Onthophagus mirandus Arrow, 1931
Onthophagus miricollis Frey, 1962
Onthophagus miricornis Orbigny, 1902
Onthophagus mirifrons Orbigny, 1905
Onthophagus miscellaneus Orbigny, 1908
Onthophagus miscellus Orbigny, 1905
Onthophagus misellus Orbigny, 1907
Onthophagus mixticeps Orbigny, 1905
Onthophagus mixtidorsis Orbigny, 1905
Onthophagus mjobergi Gillet, 1925
Onthophagus mniszechi Harold, 1869 - (Threehorned Dung Beetle)
Onthophagus moajat Huijbregts & Krikken, 2009
Onthophagus mocquerysi Orbigny, 1902
Onthophagus modestus Harold, 1862
Onthophagus mokwamensis Krikken & Huijbregts, 2012
Onthophagus monardi Boucomont, 1936
Onthophagus monardiellus Frey, 1963
Onthophagus mongana Storey & Weir, 1990
Onthophagus monodon Fåhraeus, 1857
Onthophagus monteithi Matthews, 1972
Onthophagus montishannoniae Krikken & Huijbregts, 2008
Onthophagus montivagus Orbigny, 1902
Onthophagus montreuili Moretto & Génier, 2010
Onthophagus mordindangus Masumoto, Ochi & Hanboonsong, 2008
Onthophagus moreleti Baraud, 1980
Onthophagus morenoi Moretto, 2013
Onthophagus morettoi Josso, 2022
Onthophagus moroni Zunino & Halffter, 1988
Onthophagus morosus Gerstaecker, 1871
Onthophagus mpassa Walter, 1982
Onthophagus mucronatus Thomson, 1858
Onthophagus mucronifer Orbigny, 1905
Onthophagus mugheseensis Josso, 2019
Onthophagus mulgravei Paulian, 1937
Onthophagus multipunctatus Boucomont, 1914
Onthophagus mundill Matthews, 1972
Onthophagus murchisoni Blackburn, 1892
Onthophagus murgon Monteith & Storey, 2013
Onthophagus murphyi Josso, 2019
Onthophagus musculus Frey, 1963
Onthophagus mutatus Harold, 1859
Onthophagus muticus MacLeay, 1864
Onthophagus mycetorum Zunino & Halffter, 1988
Onthophagus naaroon Masumoto, 1990
Onthophagus naevuliger Orbigny, 1908
Onthophagus nagpurensis Arrow, 1931
Onthophagus nammuldi Matthews, 1972
Onthophagus namnaoensis Masumoto, Ochi & Hanboonsong, 2002
Onthophagus namnaolekus Masumoto, Ochi & Higurashi, 2020
Onthophagus namnaous Masumoto, Ochi & Hanboonsong, 2013
Onthophagus nanus Harold, 1878
Onthophagus nasicornis Harold, 1869
Onthophagus nasicus Gillet, 1930
Onthophagus naso Fåhraeus, 1857
Onthophagus nasonis Kabakov, 1998
Onthophagus nasutus Guérin-Méneville, 1855
Onthophagus natronis Cambefort, 1984
Onthophagus navarretorum Delgado & Capistan, 1996
Onthophagus nchilaensis Josso, 2022
Onthophagus neboissi Frey, 1970
Onthophagus necrophagus Arrow, 1931
Onthophagus neervoorti Boucomont, 1914
Onthophagus negligens Walker, 1858
Onthophagus nemorivagus Kohlmann & Solis, 2001
Onthophagus neofurcatus Goidanich, 1926
Onthophagus neofuscus Moctezuma & Halffter, 2020
Onthophagus neomirabilis Howden, 1973
Onthophagus neostenocerus Goidanich, 1926
Onthophagus neyo Moretto, 2013
Onthophagus nicobaricus Biswas, Chatterjee & Sengupta, 1999
Onthophagus nigerianus Orbigny, 1913
Onthophagus nigriceps Raffray, 1877
Onthophagus nigrinus Paulian, 1937
Onthophagus nigripennis Orbigny, 1908
Onthophagus nigriventris Orbigny, 1902 - (Coastal Dung Beetle)
Onthophagus nigrivestis Orbigny, 1902
Onthophagus nigroflavus Josso, 2022
Onthophagus nilicola Orbigny, 1902
Onthophagus niloticus Harold, 1879
Onthophagus nimbatus Orbigny, 1905
Onthophagus niokolokoba Moretto, 2007
Onthophagus nitefactus Harold, 1877
Onthophagus nitidifrons Orbigny, 1905
Onthophagus nitidior Bates, 1887
Onthophagus nodieri Orbigny, 1908
Onthophagus nodulifer Harold, 1867
Onthophagus nonstriatus Orbigny, 1905
Onthophagus notatus Orbigny, 1902
Onthophagus notiodes Solis & Kohlmann, 2003
Onthophagus novaeirlandiae Balthasar, 1969
Onthophagus nubilus Kohlmann & Solis, 2001
Onthophagus nudatus Orbigny, 1913
Onthophagus nudifrons Balthasar, 1939
Onthophagus nudus Orbigny, 1908
Onthophagus nummelini Moretto & Génier, 2020
Onthophagus nurubuan Matthews, 1972
Onthophagus nyctopus Bates, 1887
Onthophagus nyikaensis Josso, 2018
Onthophagus nymani Gillet, 1930
Onthophagus oaxacanus Zunino & Halffter, 1988
Onthophagus obliviosus Balthasar, 1935
Onthophagus obtusicornis Fåhraeus, 1857
Onthophagus obtutus Péringuey, 1901
Onthophagus ocellidorsis Orbigny, 1915
Onthophagus ocellifer Orbigny, 1902
Onthophagus ocelliger Harold, 1877
Onthophagus ochii Masumoto, 1988
Onthophagus ochromerus Harold, 1877
Onthophagus ochropygus Orbigny, 1902
Onthophagus octogonus Frey, 1962
Onthophagus ofianus Krikken & Huijbregts, 2013
Onthophagus ohkuboi Ochi & Kon, 2006
Onthophagus okahandjanus Balthasar, 1974
Onthophagus oklahomensis Brown, 1927 - (Scarab beetle)
Onthophagus olidus Balthasar, 1964
Onthophagus omiltemius Bates, 1889
Onthophagus omostigma Orbigny, 1902
Onthophagus onorei Zunino & Halffter, 1997
Onthophagus onthochromus Arrow, 1913
Onthophagus ontosatu Huijbregts & Krikken, 2012
Onthophagus opacihartiniae Ochi & Kon, 2015
Onthophagus opacotaurus Krikken & Huijbregts, 2012
Onthophagus ophion Erichson, 1847
Onthophagus ophtalmicus Frey, 1958
Onthophagus orbicularis Lansberge, 1885
Onthophagus orbus Boucomont, 1924
Onthophagus orientalis Harold, 1868
Onthophagus orissanus Arrow, 1931
Onthophagus orizabensis Moctezuma, Joaqui & Sánchez-Huerta, 2019
Onthophagus ornaticollis Gillet, 1930
Onthophagus ornatulus Orbigny, 1908
Onthophagus orpheus (Panzer, 1794)
Onthophagus orphnoides Bates, 1887
Onthophagus orthocerus Thomson, 1858
Onthophagus osculatii Guérin-Méneville, 1855
Onthophagus otai Ochi & Kon, 2006
Onthophagus otjivarongus Balthasar, 1967
Onthophagus ouratita Matthews, 1972
Onthophagus ovigranosus Frey, 1971
Onthophagus ovulum Gerstaecker, 1871
Onthophagus pacificus Lansberge, 1885
Onthophagus padrinoi Delgado, 1999
Onthophagus palamoui Biswas & Chatterjee, 1986
Onthophagus palatus Boucomont, 1914
Onthophagus palavanus Balthasar, 1959
Onthophagus pallidipennis Fåhraeus, 1857
Onthophagus pallidus Orbigny, 1905
Onthophagus paluma Matthews, 1972
Onthophagus pangmaphanus Masumoto, Ochi & Higurashi, 2022
Onthophagus papuater Krikken & Huijbregts, 2012
Onthophagus papuensis Harold, 1877
Onthophagus papuplicatus Krikken & Huijbregts, 2012
Onthophagus papurugosus Krikken & Huijbregts, 2012
Onthophagus paracentricornis Ochi & Kon, 2014
Onthophagus parafasciatus Balthasar, 1974
Onthophagus parafuscus Zunino & Halffter, 2005
Onthophagus parallelicornis MacLeay, 1887
Onthophagus parapalatus Krikken & Huijbregts, 1988
Onthophagus parapedisequus Balthasar, 1969
Onthophagus paravinctus Tagliaferri & Moretto, 2012
Onthophagus parceguttatus Orbigny, 1902
Onthophagus parcepictus Orbigny, 1908
Onthophagus parcepilosus Balthasar, 1966
Onthophagus parenthesis Boucomont, 1913
Onthophagus parisii Balthasar, 1941
Onthophagus parrumbal Matthews, 1972
Onthophagus parryi Harold, 1869
Onthophagus parumnotatus Fåhraeus, 1857
Onthophagus parvus Blanchard, 1853
Onthophagus paucigranosus Lansberge, 1886
Onthophagus paulianellus Frey, 1958
Onthophagus pauliani Balthasar, 1937
Onthophagus pauper Boucomont, 1914
Onthophagus pauxillus Orbigny, 1902
Onthophagus pavidus Harold, 1877
Onthophagus pedator Sharp, 1875
Onthophagus pedester Howden & Génier, 2004
Onthophagus pedisequus Balthasar, 1969
Onthophagus penedwardsae Monteith & Storey, 2013
Onthophagus peninsulomerus Huijbregts & Krikken, 2011
Onthophagus pennsylvanicus Harold, 1871
Onthophagus pentacanthus Harold, 1867 - (Fivehorned Dung Beetle)
Onthophagus peotoxus Krikken & Huijbregts, 2012
Onthophagus peramelinus (Lea, 1923)
Onthophagus peringueyi Shipp, 1895
Onthophagus perniger Boucomont, 1930
Onthophagus perpilosus MacLeay, 1871
Onthophagus personatus Boucomont, 1914
Onthophagus petenensis Howden & Gill, 1993
Onthophagus pexatus Harold, 1869
Onthophagus peyrierasi Paulian, 1985
Onthophagus phanaeomorphus Janssens, 1954
Onthophagus phatoensis Masumoto, Ochi & Hanboonsong, 2008
Onthophagus philippemorettoi Josso, 2022
Onthophagus philippinensis Boucomont, 1919
Onthophagus phoenicocerus Lea, 1923
Onthophagus phrixus Balthasar, 1969
Onthophagus phrutsaphaakhomus Masumoto, 1992
Onthophagus phukhieoensis Masumoto, Ochi & Hanboonsong, 2007
Onthophagus picatus Orbigny, 1902
Onthophagus piceiceps Orbigny, 1904
Onthophagus picipennis Hope, 1841
Onthophagus pictipennis Orbigny, 1913
Onthophagus pictipodex Orbigny, 1902
Onthophagus picturatus Orbigny, 1908
Onthophagus pictus Reitter, 1892
Onthophagus pierrei Josso, 2022
Onthophagus pilicollis Orbigny, 1902
Onthophagus pilipodex Orbigny, 1913
Onthophagus pillara Matthews, 1972
Onthophagus pilosus Fåhraeus, 1857
Onthophagus pimpasaleei Masumoto, Ochi & Hanboonsong, 2008
Onthophagus pinaroo Storey & Weir, 1990
Onthophagus pinguis Gerstaecker, 1871
Onthophagus pipitzi Ancey, 1883
Onthophagus pisciphagus Walter & Cambefort, 1977
Onthophagus pithankithae Karimbumkara & Priyadarsanan, 2016
Onthophagus placens Péringuey, 1904
Onthophagus planaticeps Orbigny, 1913
Onthophagus planiceps MacLeay, 1886
Onthophagus planicollis Harold, 1880
Onthophagus planifrons Frey, 1962
Onthophagus platalea Arrow, 1941
Onthophagus pleurogonus Orbigny, 1913
Onthophagus plicatifrons Orbigny, 1908
Onthophagus politus (Fabricius, 1798)
Onthophagus pollicatus Harold, 1879
Onthophagus polyedrus Orbigny, 1905
Onthophagus polyodon Orbigny, 1913
Onthophagus polyphemi Hubbard, 1894 - (Onthophagus tortoise commensal scarab)
Onthophagus polystigma Orbigny, 1902
Onthophagus pooensis Cambefort & Nicolas, 1991
Onthophagus porcus Arrow, 1931
Onthophagus possoi Walter, 1982
Onthophagus posticicornis Orbigny, 1913
Onthophagus posticus Erichson, 1842
Onthophagus potosinus Moctezuma & Halffter, 2020
Onthophagus praecellens Bates, 1887
Onthophagus praelaminatus Frey, 1957
Onthophagus praestans Péringuey, 1901
Onthophagus prehensilis (Arrow, 1920)
Onthophagus probus Péringuey, 1901
Onthophagus profanus Frey, 1958
Onthophagus pronocarinatus Josso, 2019
Onthophagus pronus Erichson, 1842
Onthophagus propinquus MacLeay, 1888
Onthophagus propraecellens Howden & Gill, 1987
Onthophagus proteus Orbigny, 1902
Onthophagus proximus Orbigny, 1908
Onthophagus pseudoaeneus Orbigny, 1908
Onthophagus pseudobidens Orbigny, 1915
Onthophagus pseudobrutus Kabakov, 1983
Onthophagus pseudobufonidius Josso, 2019
Onthophagus pseudoconvexicollis Bai & Yang, 2016
Onthophagus pseudocoracinus Kabakov, 1983
Onthophagus pseudocostifer Krikken & Huijbregts, 2012
Onthophagus pseudocribripennis Josso, 2019
Onthophagus pseudofimetarius Balthasar, 1946
Onthophagus pseudofuscus Zunino & Halffter, 1988
Onthophagus pseudoguatemalensis Moctezuma & Halffter, 2021
Onthophagus pseudohystrix Masumoto, 1995
Onthophagus pseudopilosus Frey, 1958
Onthophagus pseudosanguineus Walter & Cambefort, 1977
Onthophagus pseudosellatus Balthasar, 1964
Onthophagus pseudoundulans Zunino & Halffter, 1988
Onthophagus pseudovinctus Tagliaferri & Moretto, 2012
Onthophagus ptox Erichson, 1847
Onthophagus puberulus Orbigny, 1902
Onthophagus pugionatus Fåhraeus, 1857
Onthophagus pugnacior Blackburn, 1903
Onthophagus pugnax Harold, 1868
Onthophagus pulchellus Orbigny, 1905
Onthophagus pullatus Orbigny, 1905
Onthophagus pullus Roth, 1851
Onthophagus punthari Storey, 1977
Onthophagus pupillatus Kolbe, 1886
Onthophagus purifrons Orbigny, 1908
Onthophagus purpurascens Boucomont, 1914
Onthophagus purpureicollis MacLeay, 1864
Onthophagus pusillus (Fabricius, 1798)
Onthophagus pusio Fåhraeus, 1857
Onthophagus pygidialis Lansberge, 1883
Onthophagus pygmaeus (Schaller, 1783)
Onthophagus quadricallosus Orbigny, 1902
Onthophagus quadrilunatus Orbigny, 1902
Onthophagus quadrimaculatus Raffray, 1877
Onthophagus quadrinodosus Fåhraeus, 1857
Onthophagus quadrinotatus Orbigny, 1905
Onthophagus quadripustulatus (Fabricius, 1775)
Onthophagus queenslandicus Blackburn, 1903
Onthophagus quetzalis Howden & Gill, 1993
Onthophagus quinquetuberculatus MacLeay, 1871
Onthophagus quiproquo Moretto & Génier, 2010
Onthophagus ragazzii Orbigny, 1904
Onthophagus rana Arrow, 1931
Onthophagus ranunculus Arrow, 1913
Onthophagus rasipennis Orbigny, 1908
Onthophagus ratchasimaensis Masumoto, Hanboonsong & Ochi, 2002
Onthophagus ratchataniensis Masumoto, Ochi & Hanboonsong, 2013
Onthophagus rectestriatus Orbigny, 1915
Onthophagus rectilamina Orbigny, 1902
Onthophagus rectorispauliani Cambefort, 1980
Onthophagus refulgens Arrow, 1931
Onthophagus regalis Arrow, 1907
Onthophagus reticollis MacLeay, 1886
Onthophagus reticuliger Frey, 1960
Onthophagus reticulundaticeps Josso, 2022
Onthophagus retusus Harold, 1869
Onthophagus reyesi Zunino & Halffter, 1988
Onthophagus rhinocerus Gomes Alves, 1944
Onthophagus rhinolophus Harold, 1869
Onthophagus rhinophyllus Harold, 1868
Onthophagus rhodesianus Frey, 1975
Onthophagus rhynchophorus Péringuey, 1904
Onthophagus riparius Lansberge, 1885
Onthophagus rizali Ochi, Kawahara & Cabras, 2021
Onthophagus robertminettii Josso, 2022
Onthophagus robertopoggii Ochi & Kon, 2006
Onthophagus rohwedderi Moretto, 2017
Onthophagus rojkoffianus Josso, 2018
Onthophagus rorarius Harold, 1877
Onthophagus rosemarieae Josso, 2022
Onthophagus rosenbergi Krikken & Huijbregts, 2011
Onthophagus rosettae Frey, 1958
Onthophagus rostratus Harold, 1869
Onthophagus rotundatus Orbigny, 1905
Onthophagus roubali Balthasar, 1935
Onthophagus rouyeri Boucomont, 1914
Onthophagus royi Biswas & Chatterjee, 1985
Onthophagus ruandanus Frey, 1971
Onthophagus rubefactus Orbigny, 1913
Onthophagus rubellus Orbigny, 1908
Onthophagus rubens Orbigny, 1902
Onthophagus rubenticollis Orbigny, 1902
Onthophagus rubescens MacLeay, 1888
Onthophagus rubicundulus MacLeay, 1871
Onthophagus rubidus Orbigny, 1913
Onthophagus rubrescens Blanchard, 1845
Onthophagus rubricatus Orbigny, 1902
Onthophagus rubrimaculatus MacLeay, 1864
Onthophagus rubripennis Arrow, 1907
Onthophagus rufescens Bates, 1887
Onthophagus ruficauda Arrow, 1931
Onthophagus rufipodex Orbigny, 1913
Onthophagus rufocastaneus Fairmaire, 1887
Onthophagus rufolimbatus Orbigny, 1913
Onthophagus rufonotatus Orbigny, 1902
Onthophagus rufosignatus MacLeay, 1864
Onthophagus rufovirens Orbigny, 1904
Onthophagus rugicollis Harold, 1880
Onthophagus rugidorsis Orbigny, 1913
Onthophagus rugosicollis Gillet, 1925
Onthophagus rugosipennis Frey, 1973
Onthophagus rugosissimus Orbigny, 1913
Onthophagus rupicapra Waterhouse, 1894
Onthophagus rutilans Sharp, 1875
Onthophagus rutriceps Krikken & Huijbregts, 2012
Onthophagus sabahensis Ochi & Kon, 2006
Onthophagus sahai Biswas & Chatterjee, 1986
Onthophagus saigonensis Boucomont, 1924
Onthophagus sakaeratensis Masumoto, Hanboonsong & Ochi, 2002
Onthophagus sakainoi Masumoto, 1991
Onthophagus salebrosus MacLeay, 1888
Onthophagus saleyeri Lansberge, 1883
Onthophagus salvadorensis Zunino & Halffter, 1988
Onthophagus salvazai Paulian, 1978
Onthophagus samoengus Masumoto, Ochi & Hanboonsong, 2008
Onthophagus sancristobalensis Moctezuma & Halffter, 2020
Onthophagus sanggona Huijbregts & Krikken, 2009
Onthophagus sangirensis Boucomont, 1914
Onthophagus sanguineus Orbigny, 1902
Onthophagus sanguinolentus Orbigny, 1908
Onthophagus sangwalus Masumoto, Ochi & Hanboonsong, 2008
Onthophagus sanpabloetlorum Moctezuma & Halffter, 2020
Onthophagus sansibaricus Harold, 1878
Onthophagus santamariensis Moctezuma, Sánchez-Huerta & Halffter, 2020
Onthophagus sarasinorum Krikken & Huijbregts, 2011
Onthophagus savanicola Cambefort, 1984
Onthophagus scaber Roth, 1851
Onthophagus scapularis Orbigny, 1902
Onthophagus sceptrifer Boucomont, 1924
Onthophagus schaefferi Howden & Cartwright, 1963
Onthophagus schawalleri Scheuern, 1996
Onthophagus schunckei Paulian, 1936
Onthophagus sciron Balthasar, 1969
Onthophagus sculptilis Gerstaecker, 1871
Onthophagus seabrai Gomes Alves, 1944
Onthophagus secundarius Roth, 1851
Onthophagus sellatulus Orbigny, 1902
Onthophagus sembeli Krikken & Huijbregts, 2008
Onthophagus semiaratus Orbigny, 1902
Onthophagus semiasper Orbigny, 1902
Onthophagus semicroceus Orbigny, 1915
Onthophagus semiflavus Boheman, 1860
Onthophagus semigraniger Orbigny, 1905
Onthophagus semigranosus Lansberge, 1883
Onthophagus semilaevis Orbigny, 1913
Onthophagus semimetallicus Lea, 1923
Onthophagus seminitens Orbigny, 1902
Onthophagus seminitidus Orbigny, 1908
Onthophagus semiopacus Harold, 1869
Onthophagus semipacificus Ochi & Kon, 2006
Onthophagus semivestitus Paulian, 1937
Onthophagus semivirescens Orbigny, 1902
Onthophagus semiviridis Orbigny, 1904
Onthophagus senegalensis Orbigny, 1902
Onthophagus senescens Péringuey, 1908
Onthophagus sepilokensis Ochi & Kon, 2006
Onthophagus seramicus Huijbregts & Krikken, 2012
Onthophagus serdangensis Lansberge, 1886
Onthophagus sericans Frey, 1975
Onthophagus sericeicollis Boucomont, 1928
Onthophagus serienotatus Orbigny, 1902
Onthophagus seseba Krikken & Huijbregts, 2017
Onthophagus setchan Masumoto, 1984
Onthophagus setosus Fåhraeus, 1857
Onthophagus sexdentatus Boucomont, 1919
Onthophagus sexstriatus Montrouzier, 1855
Onthophagus sharpi Harold, 1875
Onthophagus sibela Huijbregts & Krikken, 2012
Onthophagus sibuyanus Boucomont, 1924
Onthophagus sidama Gestro, 1895
Onthophagus sidangeaus Masumoto, Ochi & Higurashi, 2021
Onthophagus signaticollis Frey, 1970
Onthophagus signifer Harold, 1877
Onthophagus sihkahonoi Huijbregts & Krikken, 2009
Onthophagus sikkimensis Gillet, 1925
Onthophagus simillimus Orbigny, 1913
Onthophagus simius Reitter, 1892
Onthophagus simoni Orbigny, 1902
Onthophagus simplex Raffray, 1877
Onthophagus simplicifrons Reitter, 1892
Onthophagus simulator Orbigny, 1905
Onthophagus singulariformis Kohlmann & Solis, 2001
Onthophagus sinicus Hope, 1842
Onthophagus sinuosicollis Orbigny, 1905
Onthophagus sinuosus Orbigny, 1913
Onthophagus sipilouensis Cambefort, 1984
Onthophagus sisyphoides Krikken, 1977
Onthophagus sjoestethi Orbigny, 1904
Onthophagus skelleyi Sánchez-Huerta, Zunino & Halffter, 2018
Onthophagus sloanei Blackburn, 1903
Onthophagus smeenki Cambefort, 1980
Onthophagus smetanai Balthasar, 1952
Onthophagus snoflaki Balthasar, 1944
Onthophagus socialis Arrow, 1931
Onthophagus solidus Gillet, 1927
Onthophagus solisi Howden & Gill, 1993
Onthophagus solomonensis Krikken & Huijbregts, 2012
Onthophagus somalicola Balthasar, 1941
Onthophagus songsokensis Biswas & Chatterjee, 1985
Onthophagus sophiae Nicolas, 2006
Onthophagus sopu Krikken & Huijbregts, 2017
Onthophagus sparsepunctatus Frey, 1956
Onthophagus sparsulus Reitter, 1892
Onthophagus spiculatus Boucomont, 1914
Onthophagus spinicornis Gillet, 1930
Onthophagus spinifex (Fabricius, 1781)
Onthophagus splendidoides Josso, 2013
Onthophagus splendidus Boucomont, 1932
Onthophagus spurcatus Orbigny, 1905
Onthophagus squalidus Lea, 1923
Onthophagus stanleyi Moretto & Génier, 2010
Onthophagus stehliki Balthasar, 1966
Onthophagus steinheili Harold, 1880
Onthophagus stellio Erichson, 1843
Onthophagus stenocerus Harold, 1867
Onthophagus sternalis Arrow, 1931
Onthophagus sternax Balthasar, 1959
Onthophagus stictus Orbigny, 1913
Onthophagus stigmosus Orbigny, 1902
Onthophagus stillatus Orbigny, 1904
Onthophagus stockwelli Howden & Young, 1981
Onthophagus stomachosus Krell, 2009
Onthophagus striatulus (Palisot de Beauvois, 1809)
Onthophagus strictestriatus Orbigny, 1913
Onthophagus stuhlmanni Orbigny, 1908
Onthophagus subaeneus (Palisot de Beauvois, 1811)
Onthophagus subalternans Orbigny, 1902
Onthophagus subcancer Howden, 1973
Onthophagus subcinctus Orbigny, 1913
Onthophagus subdivisus Orbigny, 1908
Onthophagus subhumeralis Orbigny, 1902
Onthophagus subnudus Orbigny, 1902
Onthophagus subocellatus Orbigny, 1905
Onthophagus subocelliger Blackburn, 1903
Onthophagus subopacus Robinson, 1940
Onthophagus subplanus Orbigny, 1902
Onthophagus subrugosus Orbigny, 1905
Onthophagus subsulcatus Orbigny, 1908
Onthophagus subtropicus Howden & Cartwright, 1963
Onthophagus subulifer Orbigny, 1908
Onthophagus suillus Arrow, 1931
Onthophagus sulawesiensis Krikken & Huijbregts, 2011
Onthophagus sulcatulus Orbigny, 1907
Onthophagus sulci Balthasar, 1935
Onthophagus sulcipennis Orbigny, 1902
Onthophagus sumbavensis Boucomont, 1914
Onthophagus sumptuosus Paulian, 1937
Onthophagus sundanensis Lansberge, 1883
Onthophagus surdus Boucomont, 1925
Onthophagus sutiliceps Orbigny, 1902
Onthophagus sydneyensis Blackburn, 1903
Onthophagus sylvestris Walter & Cambefort, 1977
Onthophagus sylvipapuanus Krikken & Huijbregts, 2012
Onthophagus symbioticus (Arrow, 1920)
Onthophagus synceri Cambefort, 1984
Onthophagus taayai Masumoto, 1995
Onthophagus tabellicornis MacLeay, 1864
Onthophagus tabellifer Gillet, 1927
Onthophagus tabidus Balthasar, 1935
Onthophagus taboranus Orbigny, 1902
Onthophagus tacanensis Chamé-Vázquez & Sánchez-Hernández, 2022
Onthophagus taiensis Cambefort, 1984
Onthophagus takaoi Ochi & Kon, 2014
Onthophagus talpa Fåhraeus, 1857
Onthophagus tambing Krikken & Huijbregts, 2011
Onthophagus tamworthi Blackburn, 1903
Onthophagus tanganus Orbigny, 1913
Onthophagus tapirus Sharp, 1877
Onthophagus taprobanus Arrow, 1931
Onthophagus tarascus Zunino & Halffter, 1988
Onthophagus tarasovi Krikken & Huijbregts, 2012
Onthophagus tarsius Arrow, 1941
Onthophagus tatsienluensis Balthasar, 1942
Onthophagus tauroides Gillet, 1930
Onthophagus taurus (Schreber, 1759) - (Scarab beetle)
Onthophagus taxillus Balthasar, 1969
Onthophagus teitanicus Orbigny, 1902
Onthophagus telegonus Balthasar, 1969
Onthophagus telephus Balthasar, 1969
Onthophagus temporalis Orbigny, 1902
Onthophagus tenax Balthasar, 1964
Onthophagus tenebrosus Harold, 1871
Onthophagus tenuigraniger Orbigny, 1913
Onthophagus tenuistriatus Orbigny, 1905
Onthophagus terminatus (Eschscholtz, 1822)
Onthophagus terrara Storey, 1977
Onthophagus tersicollis Müller, 1947
Onthophagus tersipennis Orbigny, 1902
Onthophagus tersus Orbigny, 1913
Onthophagus tesseratus Orbigny, 1908
Onthophagus tessulatus Harold, 1871
Onthophagus testaceoviolaceus Paulian, 1937
Onthophagus tetricus Harold, 1877
Onthophagus thainuaensis Masumoto, Ochi & Hanboonsong, 2008
Onthophagus tharalithae Karimbumkara & Priyadarsanan, 2016
Onthophagus tholaayi Masumoto, 1990
Onthophagus thoreyi Harold, 1868
Onthophagus timorensis Boucomont, 1914
Onthophagus tiniocelloides Boucomont, 1925
Onthophagus tirapensis Biswas & Chatterjee, 1985
Onthophagus tnai Nithya & Sabu, 2012
Onthophagus togeman Matthews, 1972
Onthophagus tonsus Orbigny, 1902
Onthophagus tonywhitteni Krikken & Huijbregts, 2011
Onthophagus toopi Monteith & Storey, 2013
Onthophagus toraut Krikken & Huijbregts, 2011
Onthophagus totonacus Moctezuma & Halffter, 2021
Onthophagus totonicapamus Bates, 1887
Onthophagus toxopeus Krikken & Huijbregts, 2012
Onthophagus traginus Frey, 1972
Onthophagus transisthmius Howden & Young, 1981
Onthophagus transvestitus Huijbregts & Krikken, 2009
Onthophagus trapezicornis Orbigny, 1902
Onthophagus traversii Orbigny, 1904
Onthophagus trawalla Storey & Weir, 1990
Onthophagus tricariniger Orbigny, 1902
Onthophagus tricavicollis Lea, 1923
Onthophagus trichopygus Orbigny, 1905
Onthophagus tricolor Boucomont, 1914
Onthophagus tricorniger Boheman, 1860
Onthophagus tridenticeps Orbigny, 1902
Onthophagus trifidisetis Orbigny, 1905
Onthophagus triimpressus Orbigny, 1905
Onthophagus trinodosus Fåhraeus, 1857
Onthophagus trinominatus Goidanich, 1926
Onthophagus tripartitus Orbigny, 1902
Onthophagus tripolitanus Heyden, 1890
Onthophagus triptolemus Balthasar, 1969
Onthophagus tristis Harold, 1873
Onthophagus tritinctus Boucomont, 1914
Onthophagus triundulatus Balthasar, 1964
Onthophagus truncaticornis (Schaller, 1783)
Onthophagus tschadensis Balthasar, 1963
Onthophagus tschoffeni Orbigny, 1904
Onthophagus tshuapae Balthasar, 1964
Onthophagus tsubakii Ochi & Kon, 2009
Onthophagus tuberculifrons Harold, 1871 - (Scarab beetle)
Onthophagus tubericollis Raffray, 1877
Onthophagus tuckonie Matthews, 1972
Onthophagus tumami Masumoto, Ochi & Hanboonsong, 2002
Onthophagus tumidulus Gerstaecker, 1871
Onthophagus tungkamangensis Masumoto, Ochi & Hanboonsong, 2007
Onthophagus tungkamungensis Masumoto, Ochi & Hanboonsong, 2008
Onthophagus turfanicus Balthasar, 1971
Onthophagus turgidus Kohlmann & Solís, 2012
Onthophagus turneri Boucomont, 1936
Onthophagus turrbal Matthews, 1972
Onthophagus tuzetae Walter & Cambefort, 1977
Onthophagus tweedensis Blackburn, 1903
Onthophagus ubaidillahi Krikken & Huijbregts, 2012
Onthophagus uelensis Frey, 1960
Onthophagus ugoi Moretto & Génier, 2020
Onthophagus ukerewensis Balthasar, 1937
Onthophagus umbilicatus Orbigny, 1908
Onthophagus umbratus Orbigny, 1902
Onthophagus undulans Bates, 1889
Onthophagus unidentatus Boucomont, 1927
Onthophagus unifasciatus (Schaller, 1783)
Onthophagus ursinus Orbigny, 1902
Onthophagus ursus Boucomont, 1926
Onthophagus usambaricus Paulian, 1937
Onthophagus vaneyeni Frey, 1960
Onthophagus varianus Lea, 1923
Onthophagus variatus Orbigny, 1902
Onthophagus variegranosus Orbigny, 1905
Onthophagus variolaris Lansberge, 1883
Onthophagus variolicollis Lea, 1923
Onthophagus variolosus Orbigny, 1902
Onthophagus varius Orbigny, 1913
Onthophagus vassei Orbigny, 1908
Onthophagus vatovai Müller, 1942
Onthophagus velliger Orbigny, 1907
Onthophagus velutinus Horn, 1875
Onthophagus ventralis Lansberge, 1883
Onthophagus ventrosus Orbigny, 1905
Onthophagus veracruzensis Delgado & Pensado, 1998
Onthophagus vermiculatus Frey, 1970
Onthophagus verrucosus Orbigny, 1902
Onthophagus vesanus Balthasar, 1967
Onthophagus vespertilio Howden, Cartwright & Hallfter, 1956
Onthophagus vestitus Orbigny, 1902
Onthophagus vethi Krikken, 1977
Onthophagus vicinus Harold, 1886
Onthophagus victoriensis Blackburn, 1903
Onthophagus vigens Péringuey, 1901
Onthophagus vilis Harold, 1877
Onthophagus villanuevai Delgado & Deloya, 1990
Onthophagus villosus MacLeay, 1888
Onthophagus vinctoides Frey, 1957
Onthophagus vinctus Erichson, 1843
Onthophagus violaceotinctus Gillet, 1925
Onthophagus violaceoviridis Paulian, 1937
Onthophagus violetae Zunino & Halffter, 1997
Onthophagus virescens Harold, 1867
Onthophagus viridicatus Orbigny, 1902
Onthophagus viridichevrolati Moctezuma & Halffter, 2020
Onthophagus viridivinosus Kohlmann & Solis, 2001
Onthophagus viviensis Orbigny, 1905
Onthophagus vladimiri Frey, 1957
Onthophagus volsellatus Boucomont, 1920
Onthophagus vuattouxi Cambefort, 1984
Onthophagus vulpes Harold, 1877
Onthophagus vulpinaris Schönfeldt, 1906
Onthophagus vulpinus Arrow, 1931
Onthophagus vultuosus Orbigny, 1902
Onthophagus vultur Arrow, 1931
Onthophagus vylderi Orbigny, 1913
Onthophagus wagamen Matthews, 1972
Onthophagus wakelbura Matthews, 1972
Onthophagus walteri MacLeay, 1887
Onthophagus waminda Matthews, 1972
Onthophagus wanappe Storey, 1977
Onthophagus wangnamkhieoensis Masumoto, Hanboonsong & Ochi, 2002
Onthophagus wangnamkieous Masumoto, Ochi & Hanboonsong, 2008
Onthophagus waterloti Orbigny, 1908
Onthophagus waterstradti Boucomont, 1914
Onthophagus wayaua Huijbregts & Krikken, 2012
Onthophagus wensis Josso & Prévost, 2006
Onthophagus weringerong Storey & Weir, 1990
Onthophagus wiebesi Krikken, 1977
Onthophagus wigmungan Matthews, 1972
Onthophagus wilgi Matthews, 1972
Onthophagus willameorum Walter & Cambefort, 1977
Onthophagus williamsi Storey & Weir, 1990
Onthophagus witteianus Krell, 2009
Onthophagus wombalano Matthews, 1972
Onthophagus worooa Storey & Weir, 1990
Onthophagus xanthochlorus Walter & Cambefort, 1977
Onthophagus xanthomerus Bates, 1887
Onthophagus xanthopterus Orbigny, 1908
Onthophagus xanthopygus Orbigny, 1910
Onthophagus yackatoon Storey & Weir, 1990
Onthophagus yamaokai Masumoto, Ochi & Hanboonsong, 2002
Onthophagus yangi Masumoto, Tsai & Ochi, 2006
Onthophagus yanoi Matsumura, 1938
Onthophagus yaran Storey & Weir, 1990
Onthophagus yarrumba Storey, 1977
Onthophagus yasuhikoi Masumoto, Ochi & Sakchoowong, 2012
Onthophagus yescaensis Moctezuma, Hernández & Sánchez-Huerta, 2022
Onthophagus yeyeko Matthews, 1972
Onthophagus yifer Krikken & Huijbregts, 2012
Onthophagus yiryoront Matthews, 1972
Onthophagus yourula Storey & Weir, 1990
Onthophagus yucatanus Delgado-Castillo, Peraza & Deloya, 2006
Onthophagus yungaburra Matthews, 1972
Onthophagus yunkara Matthews, 1972
Onthophagus zairensis Walter & Cambefort, 1977
Onthophagus zambundaticeps Josso, 2022
Onthophagus zapotecus Zunino & Halffter, 1988
Onthophagus zebra Arrow, 1931
Onthophagus zebu Boucomont, 1921
Onthophagus zicsii Balthasar, 1967
Onthophagus zimmermanni Balthasar, 1959
Onthophagus zinovskyi Qaryagdy, 1939
Onthophagus zumpti Frey, 1954
Onthophagus zymoticus Moxey, 1963
†Onthophagus bisontinus Heer, 1862
†Onthophagus crassus Heer, 1862
†Onthophagus everestae Pierce, 1946
†Onthophagus luteus Oustalet, 1874
†Onthophagus ovatulus Heer, 1847
†Onthophagus pilauco Tello, Verdú, Rossini & Zunino, 2021
†Onthophagus prodromus Heer, 1862
†Onthophagus spitsbergeniensis Krell, 2010
†Onthophagus statzi Krell, 1990
†Onthophagus urusheeri Krell, 2000

Subgenus Palaeonthophagus Zunino, 1979

Onthophagus aerarius Reitter, 1892
Onthophagus afghanus Petrovitz, 1961
Onthophagus akinini Koenig, 1889
Onthophagus albarracinus Baraud, 1979
Onthophagus aleppensis Redtenbacher, 1843
Onthophagus amirus Kabakov, 1982
Onthophagus anatolicus Petrovitz, 1962
Onthophagus andalusicus Waltl, 1835
Onthophagus angorensis Petrovitz, 1963
Onthophagus arnoldii Kabakov, 1982
Onthophagus baraudi Nicolas, 1964
Onthophagus basipustulatus Heyden, 1889
Onthophagus bonsae Zunino, 1976
Onthophagus bytinskii Balthasar, 1960
Onthophagus carpanetoi Pittino, 1982
Onthophagus clitellifer Reitter, 1894
Onthophagus coenobita (Herbst, 1783)
Onthophagus conspersus Reitter, 1892
Onthophagus cruciatus Ménétriés, 1832
Onthophagus dacatrai Pittino, 2004
Onthophagus dellacasai Pittino & Mariani, 1981
Onthophagus dorsosignatus Orbigny, 1898
Onthophagus eulaminicornis Pittino, 2006
Onthophagus excisus Reiche & Saulcy, 1856
Onthophagus excubitor Ziani & Gudenzi, 2006
Onthophagus finschi Harold, 1877
Onthophagus fissicornis (Steven, 1809)
Onthophagus fissinasus Fairmaire, 1895
Onthophagus flagrans Reitter, 1892
Onthophagus formaneki Reitter, 1897
Onthophagus fortigibber Reitter, 1909
Onthophagus fracticornis (Preyssler, 1790)
Onthophagus furciceps Marseul, 1869
Onthophagus gibbulus (Pallas, 1781)
Onthophagus glasunowi Koshantschikov, 1894
Onthophagus gorodinskii Kabakov, 2008
Onthophagus grossepunctatus Reitter, 1905
Onthophagus hermonensis Baraud, 1982
Onthophagus hissariensis Kabakov, 2006
Onthophagus isikdagensis Pittino, 2004
Onthophagus jiupengensis Masumoto, Lan & Kiuchi, 2017
Onthophagus joannae Goljan, 1953
Onthophagus kindermanni Harold, 1877
Onthophagus kolenatii Reitter, 1892
Onthophagus koryoensis Kim, 1985
Onthophagus laticornis Gebler, 1823
Onthophagus latigena Orbigny, 1897
Onthophagus lemur (Fabricius, 1781)
Onthophagus lemuroides Orbigny, 1898
Onthophagus leucostigma (Steven, 1812)
Onthophagus lucidus (Illiger, 1800)
Onthophagus marginalis (Gebler, 1817)
Onthophagus massai Baraud, 1975
Onthophagus medius (Kugelann, 1792)
Onthophagus medvedevi Kabakov, 1982
Onthophagus merdarius Chevrolat, 1865
Onthophagus muelleri Novak, 1921
Onthophagus nebulosus Reiche, 1864
Onthophagus necessarius Reitter, 1892
Onthophagus nikolajevi Kabakov, 2006
Onthophagus nuchicornis (Linnaeus, 1758) - (Scarab beetle)
Onthophagus nurestanicus Kabakov, 1982
Onthophagus ocellatopunctatus Waterhouse, 1875
Onthophagus olsoufieffi Boucomont, 1924
Onthophagus opacicollis Reitter, 1892
Onthophagus osellai Pittino, 1982
Onthophagus ovatus (Linnaeus, 1767)
Onthophagus panici Petrovitz, 1964
Onthophagus parmatus Reitter, 1892
Onthophagus petrovitzianus Pittino, 2006
Onthophagus pljushtchi Ivanova, 2012
Onthophagus ponticus Harold, 1883
Onthophagus pseudocaccobius Reitter, 1889
Onthophagus psychopompus Ziani & Garakhloo, 2010
Onthophagus pygargus Motschulsky, 1845
Onthophagus quadrinodus Reitter, 1896
Onthophagus rachelis Martín-Piera, 1985
Onthophagus rakovici Pittino, 2004
Onthophagus rodentium Pittino, 2004
Onthophagus roessneri Ziani, 2016
Onthophagus ruficapillus Brullé, 1832
Onthophagus rufimanus Kabakov, 1982
Onthophagus sacharovskii Olsoufieff, 1918
Onthophagus samai Ziani, 2011
Onthophagus scabriusculus Harold, 1873
Onthophagus semicornis (Panzer, 1798)
Onthophagus sericatus Reitter, 1892
Onthophagus shapovalovi Gusakov, 2012
Onthophagus silus Balthasar, 1960
Onthophagus similis (Scriba, 1790)
Onthophagus speculifer Solsky, 1876
Onthophagus strabo Reitter, 1892
Onthophagus stylocerus Graëlls, 1851
Onthophagus suermelii Petrovitz, 1963
Onthophagus sutleinensis Splichal, 1910
Onthophagus suturellus Brullé, 1832
Onthophagus tesquorum Semenov & Medvedev, 1927
Onthophagus trigibber Reitter, 1892
Onthophagus trispinus Reitter, 1892
Onthophagus truchmenus Kolenati, 1846
Onthophagus vacca (Linnaeus, 1767)
Onthophagus verticicornis (Laicharting, 1781)
Onthophagus viridis Ménétriés, 1832
Onthophagus vitulus (Fabricius, 1776)
Onthophagus vlasovi Medvedev, 1958
Onthophagus zuninoi Martín-Piera, 1985
Onthophagus zuvandi Qaryagdy, 1939

Subgenus Paraphanaeomorphus Balthasar, 1959

Onthophagus acuticornis Endrödi, 1973
Onthophagus argyropygus Gillet, 1927
Onthophagus barbieri Paulian, 1978
Onthophagus bifasciatus (Fabricius, 1781)
Onthophagus carinensis Boucomont, 1914
Onthophagus comottoi Lansberge, 1885
Onthophagus comottoides Kabakov, 1998
Onthophagus cyaneus Kabakov, 2006
Onthophagus frugivorus Arrow, 1931
Onthophagus hiranoyasutoshii Ochi & Kon, 2018
Onthophagus insignicollis Frey, 1954
Onthophagus itoianus Masumoto, Ochi & Higurashi, 2022
Onthophagus janushevi Kabakov, 1983
Onthophagus jeannelianus Paulian, 1945
Onthophagus miichunus Masumoto, Ochi & Higurashi, 2020
Onthophagus morimotoi Masumoto, Ochi & Higurashi, 2021
Onthophagus napolovi Kabakov, 1998
Onthophagus phanaeicollis Lansberge, 1883
Onthophagus phanaeides Frey, 1956
Onthophagus phanaeiformis Boucomont, 1914
Onthophagus pseudojavanus Paulian, 1931
Onthophagus punneeae Masumoto, 1989
Onthophagus quadricolor Kabakov, 1983
Onthophagus saksphus Masumoto, Ochi & Higurashi, 2021
Onthophagus semipiceus Kabakov, 1998
Onthophagus shunichii Ochi, Kon & Masumoto, 2021
Onthophagus sobrius Balthasar, 1959
Onthophagus strnadi Kabakov, 1998
Onthophagus trituber (Wiedemann, 1823)
Onthophagus vaulogeri Boucomont, 1923
Onthophagus yujii Masumoto, Ochi & Sakchoowong, 2012

Subgenus Parentius Zunino, 1979

Onthophagus atricapillus Orbigny, 1908
Onthophagus emarginatus Mulsant, 1842
Onthophagus hispanicus Baraud, 1963
Onthophagus kabakovi Martín-Piera, 1985
Onthophagus lilliputanus Lansberge, 1883
Onthophagus nigellus (Illiger, 1803)
Onthophagus punctator Reitter, 1892
Onthophagus punctatus (Illiger, 1803)
Onthophagus zagrosicus (Kabakov, 2006)

Subgenus Phanaeomorphus Balthasar, 1935

Onthophagus ater Waterhouse, 1875
Onthophagus bakeri Boucomont, 1919
Onthophagus batanensis Ochi, Kawahara & Cabras, 2021
Onthophagus cernyi Balthasar, 1935
Onthophagus dorsofasciatus Fairmaire, 1893
Onthophagus fodiens Waterhouse, 1875
Onthophagus gagates Hope, 1831
Onthophagus gagatoides Kabakov, 2006
Onthophagus ginyunensis Všetečka, 1942
Onthophagus hingstoni Arrow, 1931
Onthophagus mindanaoensis Frey, 1971
Onthophagus potanini Kabakov, 1979
Onthophagus procurvus Balthasar, 1935
Onthophagus pseudojaponicus Balthasar, 1941
Onthophagus schaefernai Balthasar, 1935
Onthophagus strandi Balthasar, 1935
Onthophagus sycophanta Fairmaire, 1887
Onthophagus taiwanus Nomura, 1973
Onthophagus zavreli Balthasar, 1935
Onthophagus zetteli Masumoto, Ochi & Hanboonsong, 2002

Subgenus Pseudophanaeomorphus Ochi, 2007

Onthophagus bangueyensis Boucomont, 1914
Onthophagus baramtagal Ochi, Kon & Barclay, 2016
Onthophagus borneotagal Ochi, Kon & Barclay, 2016
Onthophagus chandrai Ochi, 2007
Onthophagus cupreotagal Ochi, Kon & Barclay, 2016
Onthophagus hiroyukii Ochi, 2007
Onthophagus johkii Ochi & Kon, 1994
Onthophagus koni Ochi, 2007
Onthophagus maryatiae Ochi & Kon, 2005
Onthophagus mentaveiensis Boucomont, 1914
Onthophagus mulutagal Ochi, Kon & Barclay, 2016
Onthophagus palawantagal Ochi, Kon & Barclay, 2016
Onthophagus parachandrai Ochi, Kon & Tsubaki, 2009
Onthophagus pasotagal Ochi, Kon & Barclay, 2016
Onthophagus quasijohkii Ochi & Kon, 2005
Onthophagus quasitagal Ochi & Kon, 2005
Onthophagus ranongjohkii Ochi, Kon & Barclay, 2016
Onthophagus sugihartoi Ochi, 2007
Onthophagus sulawesijohkii Ochi, Kon & Barclay, 2016
Onthophagus tagal Boucomont, 1924

Subgenus Serrophorus Balthasar, 1935

Onthophagus atropolitus Orbigny, 1902
Onthophagus axanicus Ochi, Kon & Pham, 2021
Onthophagus baolocensis Ochi & Kon, 2015
Onthophagus laevis Harold, 1880
Onthophagus mulleri Lansberge, 1883
Onthophagus oblongus Zhang, 1997
Onthophagus sagittarius (Fabricius, 1775) - (Sri Lankan Dung Beetle)
Onthophagus senex Boucomont, 1914
Onthophagus seniculus (Fabricius, 1781)
Onthophagus thailaevis Masumoto, Ochi & Hanboonsong, 2008

Subgenus Sinonthophagus Kabakov, 2006

Onthophagus angkhanensis Masumoto, Ochi & Hanboonsong, 2013
Onthophagus angustatus Boucomont, 1914
Onthophagus katayamai Masumoto, Ochi & Sakchoowong, 2012
Onthophagus nampatensis Tarasov & Kabakov, 2010
Onthophagus nigropubens Orbigny, 1908
Onthophagus poeophagus Kabakov, 1979
Onthophagus productus Arrow, 1907
Onthophagus rugulosus Harold, 1886
Onthophagus sumatranus Lansberge, 1883

Subgenus Strandius Balthasar, 1935

Onthophagus changshouensis Zhang, 1997
Onthophagus gibbicollis Lansberge, 1885
Onthophagus japonicus Harold, 1875
Onthophagus kuraruanus Matsumura, 1938
Onthophagus lenzii Harold, 1875
Onthophagus oshimanus Nakane, 1960
Onthophagus subansiriensis Biswas, 1979
Onthophagus tonkineus Gillet, 1921
Onthophagus yakuinsulanus Nakane, 1984

Subgenus Sunenaga Ochi, 2003

Onthophagus anguliceps Boucomont, 1914
Onthophagus avocetta Arrow, 1933
Onthophagus avocettoides (Kabakov, 1983)
Onthophagus blumei Lansberge, 1883
Onthophagus cameloides Orbigny, 1900
Onthophagus digitatus Arrow, 1931
Onthophagus kaengkrachangus Masumoto, Ochi & Hanboonsong, 2008
Onthophagus maesalongensis Masumoto, Ochi & Hanboonsong, 2013
Onthophagus mindanaensis Boucomont, 1914
Onthophagus ribbei Boucomont, 1914
Onthophagus streltsovi Tarasov & Kabakov, 2010
Onthophagus wallacei Harold, 1871

Subgenus Trichonthophagus Zunino, 1979

Onthophagus corniculatus Reiche, 1850
Onthophagus dynastoides Arrow, 1931
Onthophagus fumatus Orbigny, 1913
Onthophagus hirtus (Illiger, 1803)
Onthophagus juvencus Klug, 1835
Onthophagus loveni Gillet, 1928
Onthophagus maki (Illiger, 1803)
Onthophagus mediofuscatus Orbigny, 1908
Onthophagus producticollis Orbigny, 1908
Onthophagus quadricuspis Orbigny, 1908
Onthophagus sprecherae Moretto, 2013
Onthophagus tarandus (Fabricius, 1792)
Onthophagus triacanthus Castelnau, 1840
Onthophagus verticalis Fåhraeus, 1857
Onthophagus aries Kirby, 1825
