= Onthophagus orpheus =

Scientific classification
- Kingdom: Animalia
- Phylum: Arthropoda
- Clade: Pancrustacea
- Class: Insecta
- Order: Coleoptera
- Suborder: Polyphaga
- Infraorder: Scarabaeiformia
- Family: Scarabaeidae
- Genus: Onthophagus
- Species: O. orpheus

Binomial name
- Onthophagus orpheus (Panzer, 1794)

Species of beetle

Onthophagus orpheus is a species of dung beetle in the family Scarabaeidae. It is found primarily in the eastern United States and southeastern Canada.

== Subspecies ==
These three subspecies belong to the species Onthophagus orpheus:

- Onthophagus orpheus canadensis (Fabricius, 1801)
- Onthophagus orpheus orpheus (Panzer, 1794)
- Onthophagus orpheus pseudorpheus HOWDEN & CARTWRIGHT, 1963
