= Onthophagus ceylonicus =

Scientific classification
- Kingdom: Animalia
- Phylum: Arthropoda
- Clade: Pancrustacea
- Class: Insecta
- Order: Coleoptera
- Suborder: Polyphaga
- Infraorder: Scarabaeiformia
- Family: Scarabaeidae
- Genus: Onthophagus
- Species: O. ceylonicus

Binomial name
- Onthophagus ceylonicus Harold, 1859

Synonyms
- Onthophagus ceylonicus Harold, 1877; Onthophagus difficilis Walker, 1858

Species of beetle

Onthophagus ceylonicus, is a species of dung beetle found in India and Sri Lanka.
