= Onthophagus cynomysi =

Scientific classification
- Kingdom: Animalia
- Phylum: Arthropoda
- Clade: Pancrustacea
- Class: Insecta
- Order: Coleoptera
- Suborder: Polyphaga
- Infraorder: Scarabaeiformia
- Family: Scarabaeidae
- Genus: Onthophagus
- Species: O. cynomysi

Binomial name
- Onthophagus cynomysi Brown, 1927

Species of beetle

Onthophagus cynomysi is a species of dung beetle in the family Scarabaeidae.
