= Onthophagus alluvius =

Scientific classification
- Kingdom: Animalia
- Phylum: Arthropoda
- Clade: Pancrustacea
- Class: Insecta
- Order: Coleoptera
- Suborder: Polyphaga
- Infraorder: Scarabaeiformia
- Family: Scarabaeidae
- Genus: Onthophagus
- Species: O. alluvius

Binomial name
- Onthophagus alluvius Howden & Cartwright, 1963

Species of beetle

Onthophagus alluvius is a species of dung beetle in the family Scarabaeidae. It is native to the southern United States, including Texas. It has been observed using dog dung.
