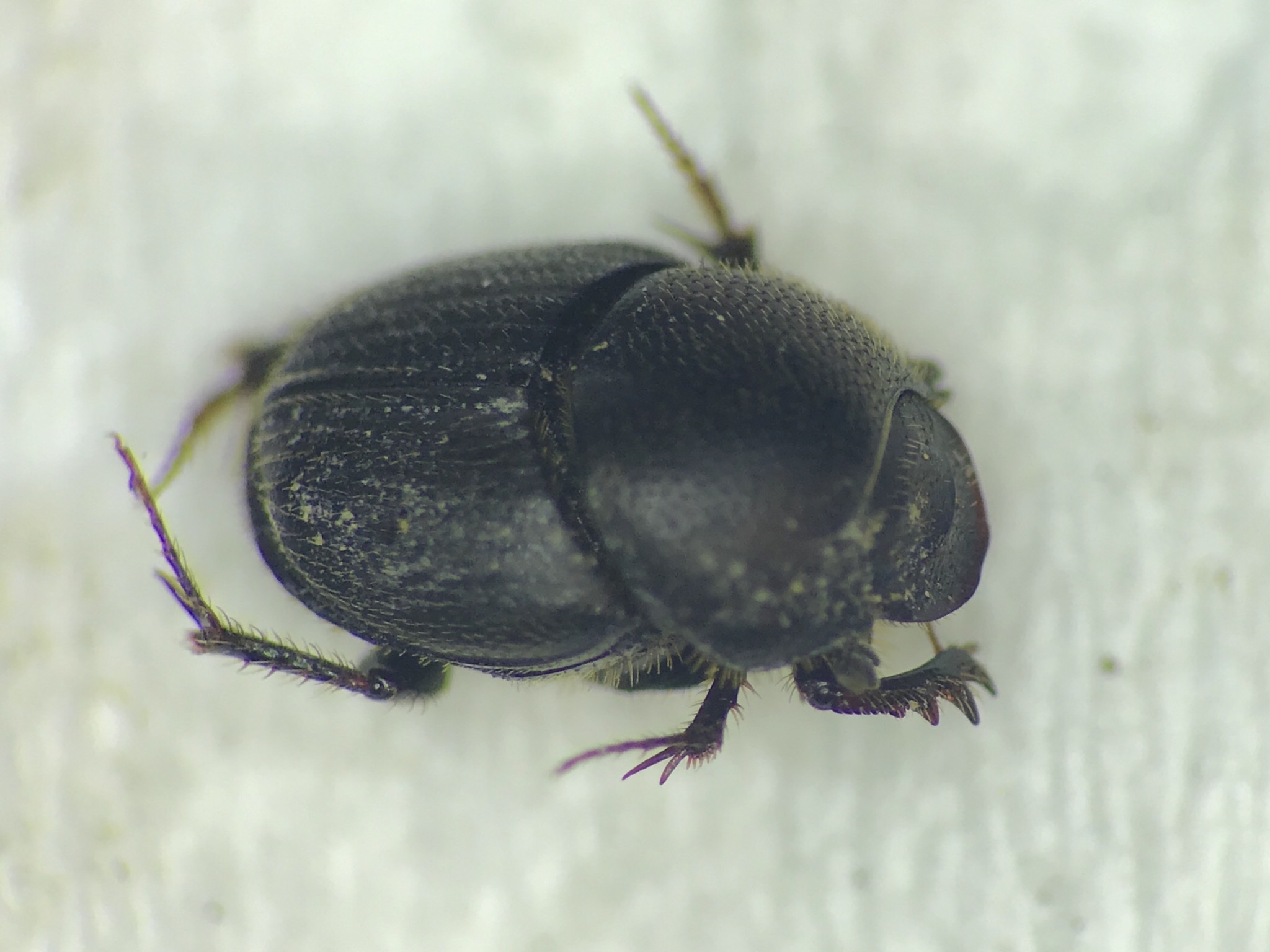

Scientific classification
- Kingdom: Animalia
- Phylum: Arthropoda
- Clade: Pancrustacea
- Class: Insecta
- Order: Coleoptera
- Suborder: Polyphaga
- Infraorder: Scarabaeiformia
- Family: Scarabaeidae
- Genus: Onthophagus
- Species: O. pennsylvanicus

Binomial name
- Onthophagus pennsylvanicus Harold, 1871

Synonyms
- Onthophagus falcipes Harold, 1871

= Onthophagus pennsylvanicus =

Species of beetle

Onthophagus pennsylvanicus is a species of dung beetle in the family Scarabaeidae. It is found in North America.
