= Onthophagus laevigatus =

Scientific classification
- Kingdom: Animalia
- Phylum: Arthropoda
- Clade: Pancrustacea
- Class: Insecta
- Order: Coleoptera
- Suborder: Polyphaga
- Infraorder: Scarabaeiformia
- Family: Scarabaeidae
- Genus: Onthophagus
- Species: O. laevigatus

Binomial name
- Onthophagus laevigatus (Fabricius, 1798)

Synonyms
- Copris laevigatus Fabricius, 1798

Species of beetle

Onthophagus laevigatus, is a species of dung beetle found in India and Sri Lanka.
