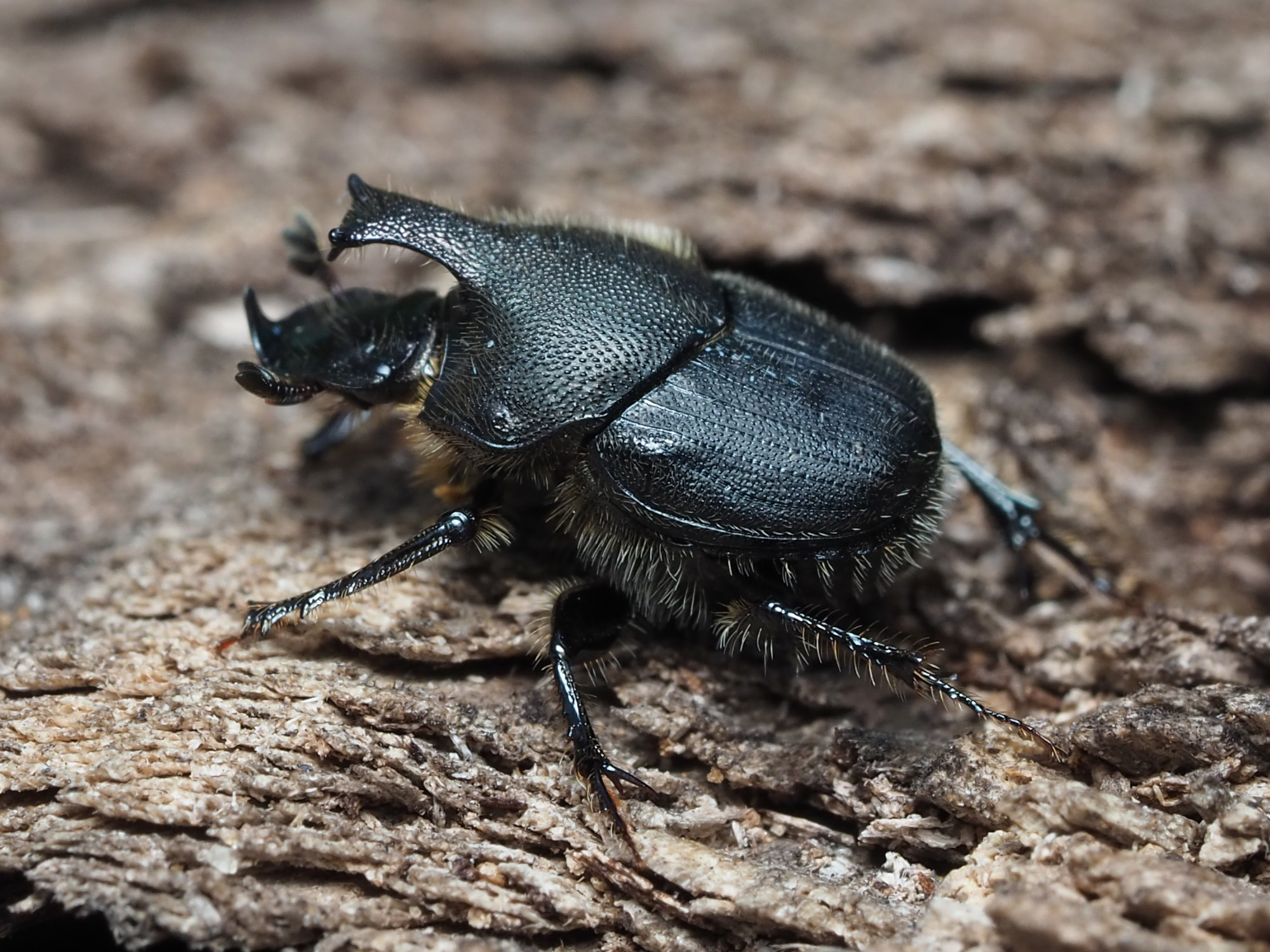

Scientific classification
- Kingdom: Animalia
- Phylum: Arthropoda
- Clade: Pancrustacea
- Class: Insecta
- Order: Coleoptera
- Suborder: Polyphaga
- Infraorder: Scarabaeiformia
- Family: Scarabaeidae
- Genus: Onthophagus
- Species: O. hecate

Binomial name
- Onthophagus hecate (Panzer, 1794)

= Onthophagus hecate =

Species of beetle

Onthophagus hecate, the scooped scarab, is a species of dung beetle in the family Scarabaeidae.

== Subspecies ==
These two subspecies belong to the species Onthophagus hecate:

- Onthophagus hecate blatchleyi Brown, 1929
- Onthophagus hecate hecate (Panzer, 1794)
