= Onthophagus civettae =

Scientific classification
- Kingdom: Animalia
- Phylum: Arthropoda
- Clade: Pancrustacea
- Class: Insecta
- Order: Coleoptera
- Suborder: Polyphaga
- Infraorder: Scarabaeiformia
- Family: Scarabaeidae
- Genus: Onthophagus
- Species: O. civettae

Binomial name
- Onthophagus civettae Cambefort, 1984

Species of beetle

Onthophagus civettae is a species of insect in the genus Onthophagus of the family Scarabaeidae in the order Coleoptera.

== Taxonomy ==
It was described in 1984 by Cambefort.
