= Onthophagus haematopus =

Scientific classification
- Kingdom: Animalia
- Phylum: Arthropoda
- Clade: Pancrustacea
- Class: Insecta
- Order: Coleoptera
- Suborder: Polyphaga
- Infraorder: Scarabaeiformia
- Family: Scarabaeidae
- Genus: Onthophagus
- Species: O. haematopus

Binomial name
- Onthophagus haematopus Harold, 1875

Species of beetle

Onthophagus haematopus is a species of beetle of the family Scarabaeidae. It is found in Bolivia, Brazil (Acre, Bahia, Pará), Colombia, Ecuador, French Guiana, Peru and Suriname.
