= Onthophagus concinnus =

Scientific classification
- Kingdom: Animalia
- Phylum: Arthropoda
- Clade: Pancrustacea
- Class: Insecta
- Order: Coleoptera
- Suborder: Polyphaga
- Infraorder: Scarabaeiformia
- Family: Scarabaeidae
- Genus: Onthophagus
- Species: O. concinnus

Binomial name
- Onthophagus concinnus Laporte, 1840

Synonyms
- Onthophagus protensus Melsheimer, 1845

Species of beetle

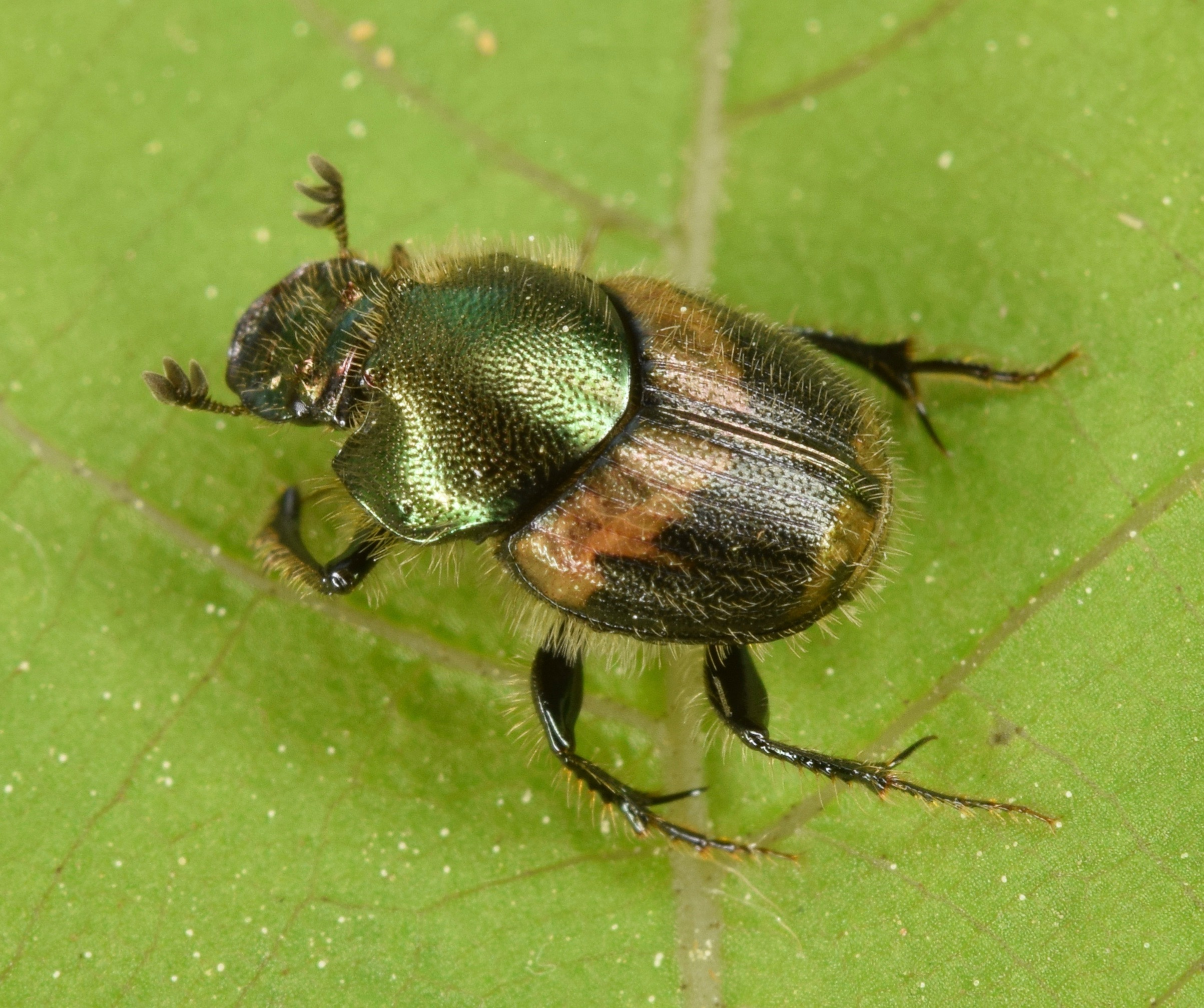

Onthophagus concinnus is a species of dung beetle in the family Scarabaeidae.
