= Onthophagus landolti =

Scientific classification
- Kingdom: Animalia
- Phylum: Arthropoda
- Clade: Pancrustacea
- Class: Insecta
- Order: Coleoptera
- Suborder: Polyphaga
- Infraorder: Scarabaeiformia
- Family: Scarabaeidae
- Genus: Onthophagus
- Species: O. landolti

Binomial name
- Onthophagus landolti Harold, 1880

Species of beetle

Onthophagus landolti is a species of dung beetle in the family Scarabaeidae.

== Subspecies ==
These two subspecies belong to the species Onthophagus landolti:

- Onthophagus landolti landolti Harold, 1880^{i g}
- Onthophagus landolti texanus Schaeffer, 1914^{i c g}

Data sources: i = ITIS, c = Catalogue of Life, g = GBIF, b = Bugguide.net
