= Onthophagus cavernicollis =

Scientific classification
- Kingdom: Animalia
- Phylum: Arthropoda
- Clade: Pancrustacea
- Class: Insecta
- Order: Coleoptera
- Suborder: Polyphaga
- Infraorder: Scarabaeiformia
- Family: Scarabaeidae
- Genus: Onthophagus
- Species: O. cavernicollis

Binomial name
- Onthophagus cavernicollis Howden & Cartwright, 1963

Species of beetle

Onthophagus cavernicollis is a species of dung beetle in the family Scarabaeidae.
