= Onthophagus hispanicus =

Scientific classification
- Kingdom: Animalia
- Phylum: Arthropoda
- Clade: Pancrustacea
- Class: Insecta
- Order: Coleoptera
- Suborder: Polyphaga
- Infraorder: Scarabaeiformia
- Family: Scarabaeidae
- Genus: Onthophagus
- Species: O. hispanicus

Binomial name
- Onthophagus hispanicus Baraud, 1963

Species of beetle

Onthophagus hispanicus is a species of beetle of the family Scarabaeidae. It is found in Spain.

== Description ==
Adults reach a length of about 5.5 mm. The body is entirely dull, dark brown to black, with a strong coppery sheen. There are light brown hairs above and below.
