= Onthophagus polyphemi =

Scientific classification
- Kingdom: Animalia
- Phylum: Arthropoda
- Clade: Pancrustacea
- Class: Insecta
- Order: Coleoptera
- Suborder: Polyphaga
- Infraorder: Scarabaeiformia
- Family: Scarabaeidae
- Genus: Onthophagus
- Species: O. polyphemi

Binomial name
- Onthophagus polyphemi Hubbard, 1894

Species of beetle

Onthophagus polyphemi, known commonly as the gopher tortoise onthophagus beetle or onthophagus tortoise commensal scarab, is a species of dung beetle in the family Scarabaeidae.

== Subspecies ==
These two subspecies belong to the species Onthophagus polyphemi:

- Onthophagus polyphemi polyphemi Hubbard, 1894
- Onthophagus polyphemi sparsisetosus Howden & Cartwright, 1963
