= Onthophagus favrei =

Scientific classification
- Kingdom: Animalia
- Phylum: Arthropoda
- Clade: Pancrustacea
- Class: Insecta
- Order: Coleoptera
- Suborder: Polyphaga
- Infraorder: Scarabaeiformia
- Family: Scarabaeidae
- Genus: Onthophagus
- Species: O. favrei

Binomial name
- Onthophagus favrei Boucomont, 1914

Species of beetle

Onthophagus favrei, is a species of dung beetle found in India, and Sri Lanka.

== Description ==
This oval, medium convex species has an average length of 5 to 7.5 millimetres (0.2 to 0.3 in). Male is smaller than female.
