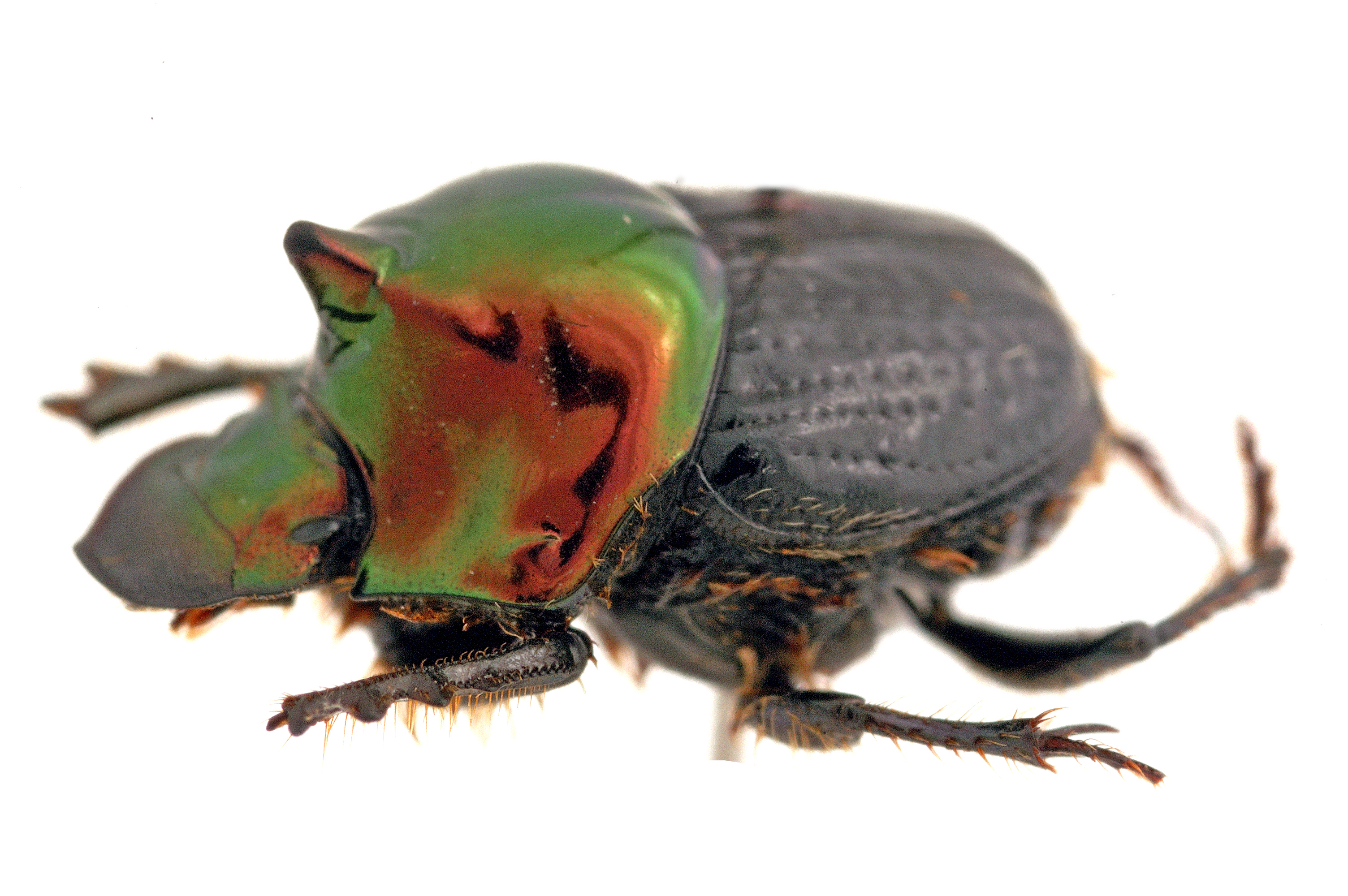

Scientific classification
- Kingdom: Animalia
- Phylum: Arthropoda
- Clade: Pancrustacea
- Class: Insecta
- Order: Coleoptera
- Suborder: Polyphaga
- Infraorder: Scarabaeiformia
- Family: Scarabaeidae
- Genus: Onthophagus
- Species: O. dandalu

Binomial name
- Onthophagus dandalu Matthews 1972

= Onthophagus dandalu =

Species of dung beetle

Onthophagus dandalu is an Australian species of dung beetle in the genus Onthophagus.
