= Onthophagus coproides =

Scientific classification
- Kingdom: Animalia
- Phylum: Arthropoda
- Clade: Pancrustacea
- Class: Insecta
- Order: Coleoptera
- Suborder: Polyphaga
- Infraorder: Scarabaeiformia
- Family: Scarabaeidae
- Genus: Onthophagus
- Species: O. coproides

Binomial name
- Onthophagus coproides Horn, 1881

Synonyms
- Onthophagus cuboidalis Bates, 1887

Species of beetle

Onthophagus coproides is a species of dung beetle in the family Scarabaeidae. It is found in Southwestern United States and in northern Mexico. It measures 11–14 mm (0.43–0.55 in) in length.
