= Onthophagus striatulus =

Scientific classification
- Kingdom: Animalia
- Phylum: Arthropoda
- Clade: Pancrustacea
- Class: Insecta
- Order: Coleoptera
- Suborder: Polyphaga
- Infraorder: Scarabaeiformia
- Family: Scarabaeidae
- Genus: Onthophagus
- Species: O. striatulus

Binomial name
- Onthophagus striatulus (Palisot de Beauvois, 1809)

Species of beetle

Onthophagus striatulus is a species of dung beetle in the family Scarabaeidae. It is found in North America.

== Subspecies ==
These two subspecies belong to the species Onthophagus striatulus:

- Onthophagus striatulus floridanus Blatchley, 1928
- Onthophagus striatulus striatulus (Palisot de Beauvois, 1809)
