= Onthophagus tuberculifrons =

Scientific classification
- Kingdom: Animalia
- Phylum: Arthropoda
- Clade: Pancrustacea
- Class: Insecta
- Order: Coleoptera
- Suborder: Polyphaga
- Infraorder: Scarabaeiformia
- Family: Scarabaeidae
- Genus: Onthophagus
- Species: O. tuberculifrons

Binomial name
- Onthophagus tuberculifrons Harold, 1871

Species of beetle

Onthophagus tuberculifrons is a species of dung beetle in the family Scarabaeidae. It is found in Oceania.
