= Onthophagus rubrescens =

Scientific classification
- Kingdom: Animalia
- Phylum: Arthropoda
- Clade: Pancrustacea
- Class: Insecta
- Order: Coleoptera
- Suborder: Polyphaga
- Infraorder: Scarabaeiformia
- Family: Scarabaeidae
- Genus: Onthophagus
- Species: O. rubrescens

Binomial name
- Onthophagus rubrescens Blanchard, 1845

Species of beetle

Onthophagus rubrescens is a species of beetle of the family Scarabaeidae. It is found in Bolivia, Brazil (Acre, Mato Grosso), Colombia, Ecuador, French Guiana, Guyana, Peru and Suriname.
