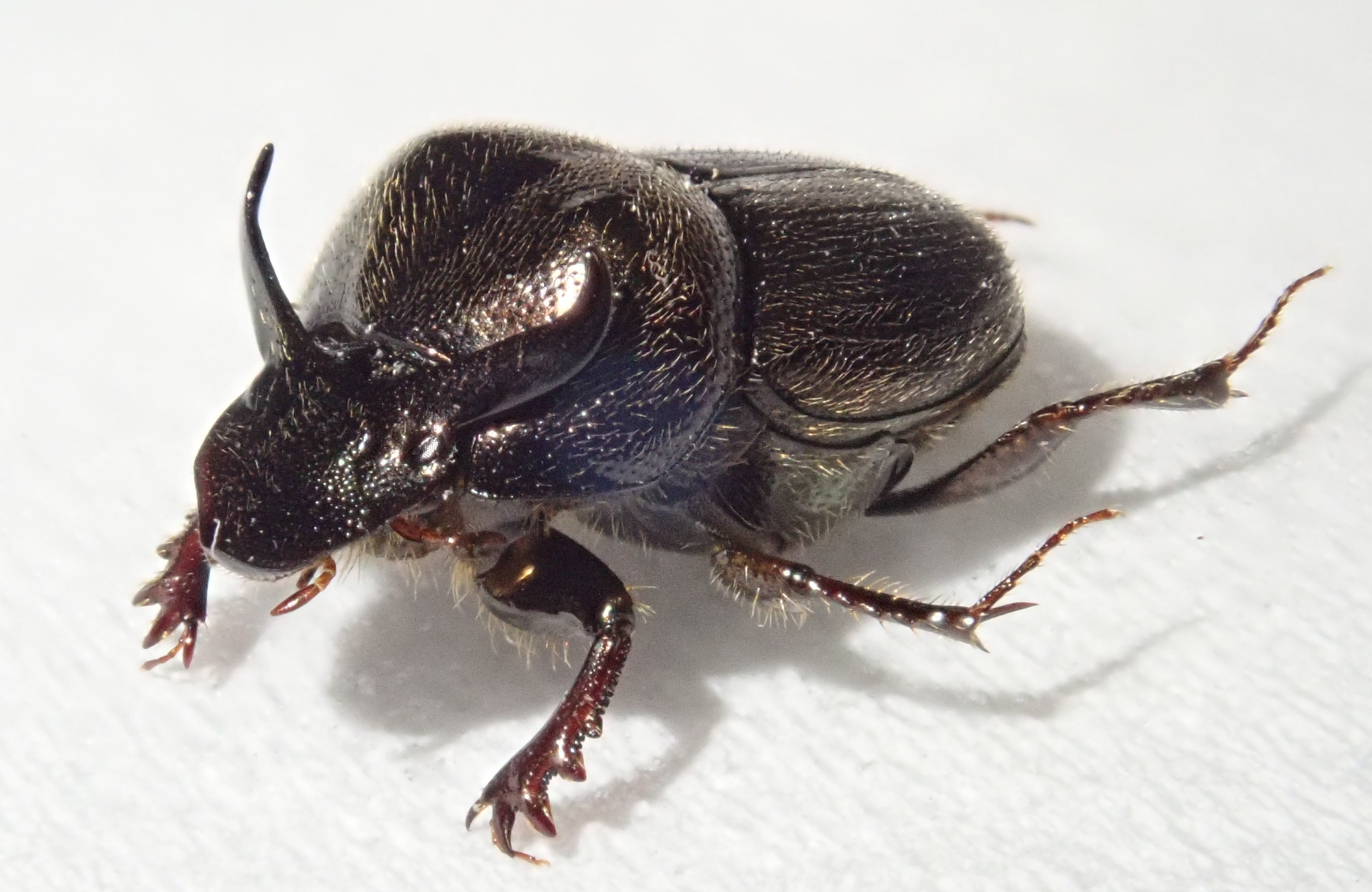
- Onthophagus (Gibbonthophagus) amamiensis

Scientific classification
- Kingdom: Animalia
- Phylum: Arthropoda
- Clade: Pancrustacea
- Class: Insecta
- Order: Coleoptera
- Suborder: Polyphaga
- Infraorder: Scarabaeiformia
- Family: Scarabaeidae
- Subfamily: Scarabaeinae
- Tribe: Onthophagini
- Genus: Onthophagus
- Subgenus: Gibbonthophagus; Balthasar, 1935

= Gibbonthophagus =

Subgenus of beetles

Gibbonthophagus is a subgenus of scarab beetles in the genus Onthophagus of the family Scarabaeidae. There are more than 40 described species in Gibbonthophagus. They are found mainly in Asia.

== Species ==
These 46 species belong to the subgenus Gibbonthophagus:

- Onthophagus amamiensis Nomura, 1965
- Onthophagus apicetinctus Orbigny, 1898
- Onthophagus asiaticus Endrödi, 1973
- Onthophagus atripennis Waterhouse, 1875
- Onthophagus balthasari Všetečka, 1939
- Onthophagus bisscrutator Krikken & Huijbregts, 2017
- Onthophagus cervicapra Boucomont, 1914
- Onthophagus chineicus Kabakov, 1998
- Onthophagus denticornis Boucomont, 1914
- Onthophagus dubernardi Boucomont, 1914
- Onthophagus duporti Boucomont, 1914
- Onthophagus draconisaurei Urban, 2026
- Onthophagus euryceros Kabakov, 1998
- Onthophagus fujiii Ochi & Kon, 1995
- Onthophagus hiabunicus Kabakov, 1998
- Onthophagus incollaris Kabakov, 2008
- Onthophagus kentingensis Nomura, 1973
- Onthophagus kimioi Ochi, Kon & Kawahara, 2011
- Onthophagus kiyoshii Ochi & Kon, 2007
- Onthophagus laichauensis Ochi, Kon & Pham, 2021
- Onthophagus lenis Kabakov, 1998
- Onthophagus limbatus (Herbst, 1789)
- Onthophagus luridipennis Boheman, 1858
- Onthophagus nasalis Arrow, 1931
- Onthophagus nigriobscurior Ochi, Kon & Tsubaki, 2009
- Onthophagus obscurior Boucomont, 1914
- Onthophagus palawanicus Ochi & Kon, 2004
- Onthophagus parviobscurior Ochi, Kon & Tsubaki, 2009
- Onthophagus penmani Masumoto, Ochi & Hanboonsong, 2002
- Onthophagus privus Kabakov, 1998
- Onthophagus proletarius Harold, 1875
- Onthophagus quangnamensis Ochi, Kon & Pham, 2021
- Onthophagus rectecornutus Lansberge, 1883
- Onthophagus remotus Harold, 1879
- Onthophagus rufiobscurior Ochi, Kon & Tsubaki, 2009
- Onthophagus sasajii Ochi & Kon, 2001
- Onthophagus schillhammeri Kabakov, 2006
- Onthophagus scrutator Harold, 1877
- Onthophagus semipersonatus Ochi, Kon & Tsubaki, 2009
- Onthophagus solivagus Harold, 1886
- Onthophagus subcornutus Boucomont, 1914
- Onthophagus sunantaae Masumoto, 1989
- Onthophagus susterai Balthasar, 1952
- Onthophagus taeniatus Boucomont, 1914
- Onthophagus taurinus White, 1844
- Onthophagus viduus Harold, 1875
- Onthophagus viridicervicapra Ochi, Kon & Tsubaki, 2009
