= Eremonthophagus =

Scientific classification
- Domain: Eukaryota
- Kingdom: Animalia
- Phylum: Arthropoda
- Class: Insecta
- Order: Coleoptera
- Suborder: Polyphaga
- Infraorder: Scarabaeiformia
- Family: Scarabaeidae
- Subfamily: Scarabaeinae
- Tribe: Onthophagini
- Genus: Onthophagus
- Subgenus: Eremonthophagus; Zunino, 1979

Subgenus of beetles

Eremonthophagus is a subgenus of scarab beetles in the genus Onthophagus of the family Scarabaeidae. There are about seven described species in Eremonthophagus. They are found mainly in Africa and Asia.

== Species ==
These seven species belong to the subgenus Eremonthophagus:

- Onthophagus abeillei Orbigny, 1897
- Onthophagus heydeni Harold, 1875
- Onthophagus infuscatus Klug, 1845
- Onthophagus oberthueri Orbigny, 1898
- Onthophagus semicinctus Orbigny, 1897
- Onthophagus sticticus Harold, 1867
- Onthophagus transcaspicus Koenig, 1889
