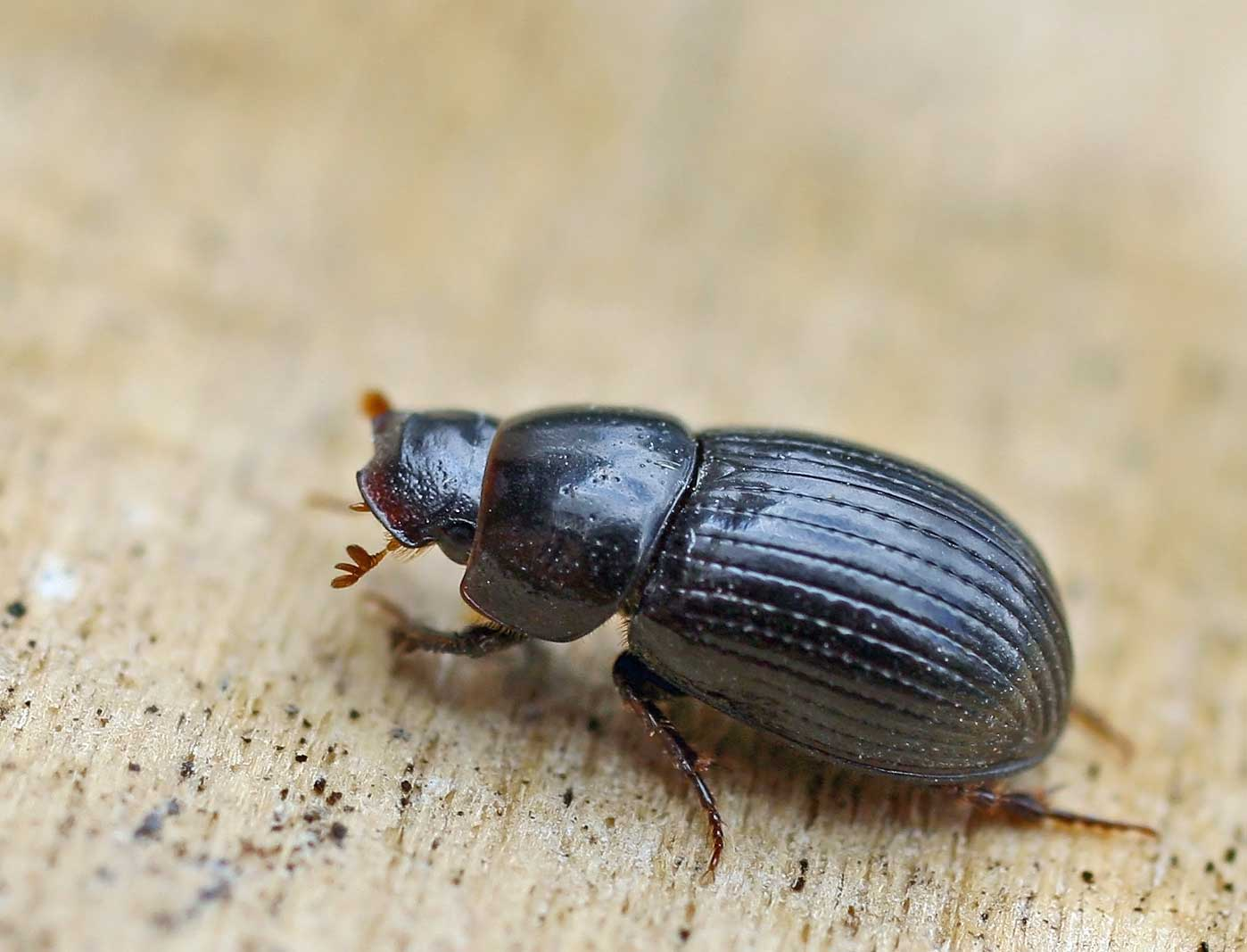
- Onthophagus furcatus

Scientific classification
- Domain: Eukaryota
- Kingdom: Animalia
- Phylum: Arthropoda
- Class: Insecta
- Order: Coleoptera
- Suborder: Polyphaga
- Infraorder: Scarabaeiformia
- Family: Scarabaeidae
- Subfamily: Scarabaeinae
- Tribe: Onthophagini
- Genus: Onthophagus
- Subgenus: Furconthophagus; Zunino, 1979

= Furconthophagus =

Subgenus of beetles

Furconthophagus is a subgenus of scarab beetles in the genus Onthophagus of the family Scarabaeidae. There are more than 20 described species in Furconthophagus. They are found mainly in Africa, Asia, and Europe.

== Species ==
These 29 species belong to the subgenus Furconthophagus:

- Onthophagus aethiopicus Orbigny, 1902
- Onthophagus amicus (Gillet, 1925)
- Onthophagus boucomonti Paulian, 1931
- Onthophagus dapcauensis Boucomont, 1921
- Onthophagus flaviclava Orbigny, 1902
- Onthophagus frontalis Raffray, 1877
- Onthophagus furcatoides Lansberge, 1886
- Onthophagus furcatus (Fabricius, 1781)
- Onthophagus karenensis Masumoto, Ochi & Hanboonsong, 2008
- Onthophagus khonkaenus Masumoto, Ochi & Hanboonsong, 2008
- Onthophagus lamelliger Gerstaecker, 1871
- Onthophagus liwondeensis Josso, 2019
- Onthophagus monforti Josso & Prévost, 2006
- Onthophagus papulatorius Kabakov, 2008
- Onthophagus papulatus Boucomont, 1914
- Onthophagus parvulus (Fabricius, 1798)
- Onthophagus promontorii Boucomont, 1924
- Onthophagus rugulipennis Fairmaire, 1887
- Onthophagus schoolmeestersi Ochi & Kon, 2007
- Onthophagus sellatus Klug, 1845
- Onthophagus shaykh Montanaro & Ziani, 2022
- Onthophagus suffusus Klug, 1855
- Onthophagus sugillatus Klug, 1855
- Onthophagus troglodyta (Wiedemann, 1823)
- Onthophagus ulula Balthasar, 1966
- Onthophagus valentineae Josso, 2019
- Onthophagus variegatus (Fabricius, 1798)
- Onthophagus verae Josso, 2013
- Onthophagus versutus Péringuey, 1901
