= Tiaronthophagus ebenus =

Scientific classification
- Kingdom: Animalia
- Phylum: Arthropoda
- Class: Insecta
- Order: Coleoptera
- Suborder: Polyphaga
- Infraorder: Scarabaeiformia
- Family: Scarabaeidae
- Subfamily: Scarabaeinae
- Tribe: Onthophagini
- Genus: Tiaronthophagus
- Species: T. ebenus

Binomial name
- Tiaronthophagus ebenus (Péringuey, 1888)

Synonyms
- Onthophagus bituber Orbigny, 1904; Onthophagus ebenus Péringuey, 1888; Onthophagus natalicus Orbigny, 1902

Species of beetle

Tiaronthophagus ebenus is a species of scarab beetle in the family Scarabaeidae. It is found in Africa.

== Onthophagus ebenus ==
Tiaronthophagus ebenus

Scientific classification
- Kingdom: Animalia
- Phylum: Arthropoda
- Class: Insecta
- Order: Coleoptera
- Suborder: Polyphaga
- Infraorder: Scarabaeiformia
- Family: Scarabaeidae
- Genus: Onthophagus
- Species: O. ebenus

Binomial name
- Onthophagus ebenus Péringuey, 1888

Onthophagus ebenus is a species of bug that was first described by Louis Péringuey in the year of 1888. No sub-species are listed at Catalogue of Life.
