= Onthophagus turbatus =

Scientific classification
- Kingdom: Animalia
- Phylum: Arthropoda
- Clade: Pancrustacea
- Class: Insecta
- Order: Coleoptera
- Suborder: Polyphaga
- Infraorder: Scarabaeiformia
- Family: Scarabaeidae
- Genus: Onthophagus
- Species: O. turbatus

Binomial name
- Onthophagus turbatus Walker, 1858

Species of beetle

Onthophagus turbatus, is a species of dung beetle found in India, and Sri Lanka.

== Description ==
This oval, compact and less convex species has an average length of about 7 to 8 mm..
