= Onthophagus spinifex =

Scientific classification
- Kingdom: Animalia
- Phylum: Arthropoda
- Clade: Pancrustacea
- Class: Insecta
- Order: Coleoptera
- Suborder: Polyphaga
- Infraorder: Scarabaeiformia
- Family: Scarabaeidae
- Genus: Onthophagus
- Species: O. spinifex

Binomial name
- Onthophagus spinifex (Fabricius, 1781)

Synonyms
- Scarabaeus spinifex Fabricius, 1781; Onthophagus bifossus D'Orbigny, 1902; Onthophagus reflexicornis Redtenbacher, 1867; Scarabaeus aeneus Fabricius, 1781; Scarabaeus spinifer Olivier, 1789

Species of beetle

Onthophagus spinifex, is a species of dung beetle found in India, Sri Lanka, Bangladesh and China.
