= Onthophagus hastifer =

Scientific classification
- Kingdom: Animalia
- Phylum: Arthropoda
- Clade: Pancrustacea
- Class: Insecta
- Order: Coleoptera
- Suborder: Polyphaga
- Infraorder: Scarabaeiformia
- Family: Scarabaeidae
- Genus: Onthophagus
- Species: O. hastifer

Binomial name
- Onthophagus hastifer Lansberge, 1885

Synonyms
- Onthophagus agilis Matsumura, 1938; Onthophagus putealis Matsumura, 1938; Onthophagus turbatus Boucomont, 1921; Onthophagus turmalis Gillet, 1924

Species of beetle

Onthophagus hastifer, is a species of dung beetle found in India, Sri Lanka, Vietnam, Taiwan, Thailand, and Myanmar.

== Description ==
This oval, compact and less convex species has an average length of about 6 to 7 mm. Body bronze to reddish-brown in color with metallic shine on dorsum. In each elytron, there is a transverse orange basal patch between shoulder and suture. Pygidium also orange in color whereas antennae and mouthparts are yellowish. Minute greyish setae found on the dorsum. Head broad, with rugose clypeus. Clypeus divided from the forehead by a curved carina. Pronotum finely, closely, and uniformly punctured. Elytra finely striate, with flat intervals. Pygidium fairly strongly punctured. Male are observed in two forms as: long-horned phase and short-horned phase. In the long-horned phase, there is an extremely long and slender thread-like horn on head which curves backward. But in short-horned phase, there is a very short transverse tubercle between the eyes. Female beetle has a transverse carina between the eyes on head.

Adults are observed from buffalo and cow dung.
