= Onthophagus negligens =

Scientific classification
- Kingdom: Animalia
- Phylum: Arthropoda
- Clade: Pancrustacea
- Class: Insecta
- Order: Coleoptera
- Suborder: Polyphaga
- Infraorder: Scarabaeiformia
- Family: Scarabaeidae
- Genus: Onthophagus
- Species: O. negligens

Binomial name
- Onthophagus negligens Walker, 1858

Species of beetle

Onthophagus negligens, is a species of dung beetle found in India, and Sri Lanka.

== Description ==
This oval, very convex species has an average length of about 5 to 6 mm (0.20 to 0.24 in).
