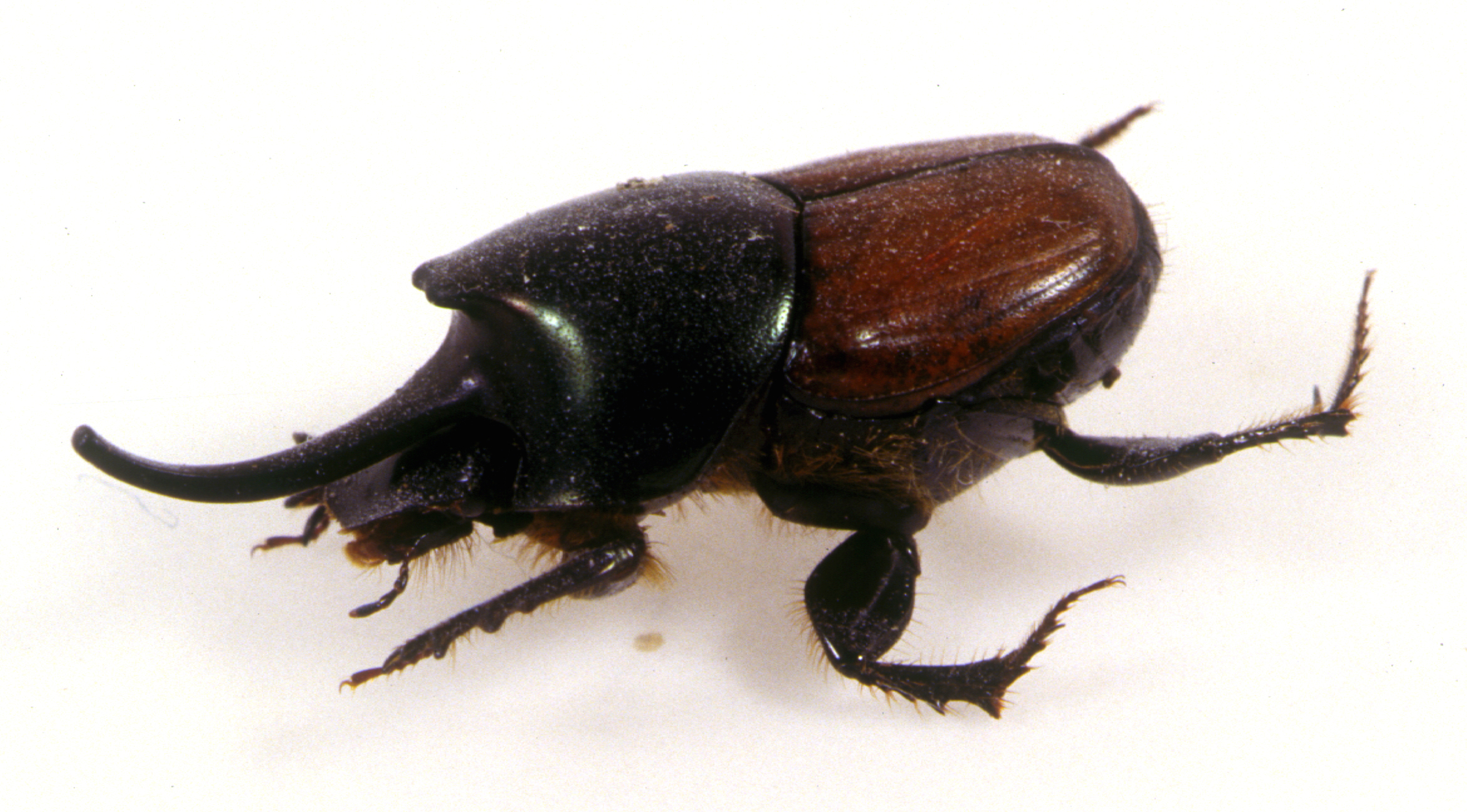

Scientific classification
- Kingdom: Animalia
- Phylum: Arthropoda
- Clade: Pancrustacea
- Class: Insecta
- Order: Coleoptera
- Suborder: Polyphaga
- Infraorder: Scarabaeiformia
- Family: Scarabaeidae
- Genus: Onthophagus
- Species: O. nigriventris

Binomial name
- Onthophagus nigriventris D'Orbigny, 1902

= Onthophagus nigriventris =

Species of beetle

Onthophagus nigriventris is a species of dung beetle in the family Scarabaeidae. It is found in East Africa (Kenya, Rwanda, Tanzania) with introduced populations in Australia (eastern Queensland and New South Wales). In Australia, it is known as the coastal dung beetle.
