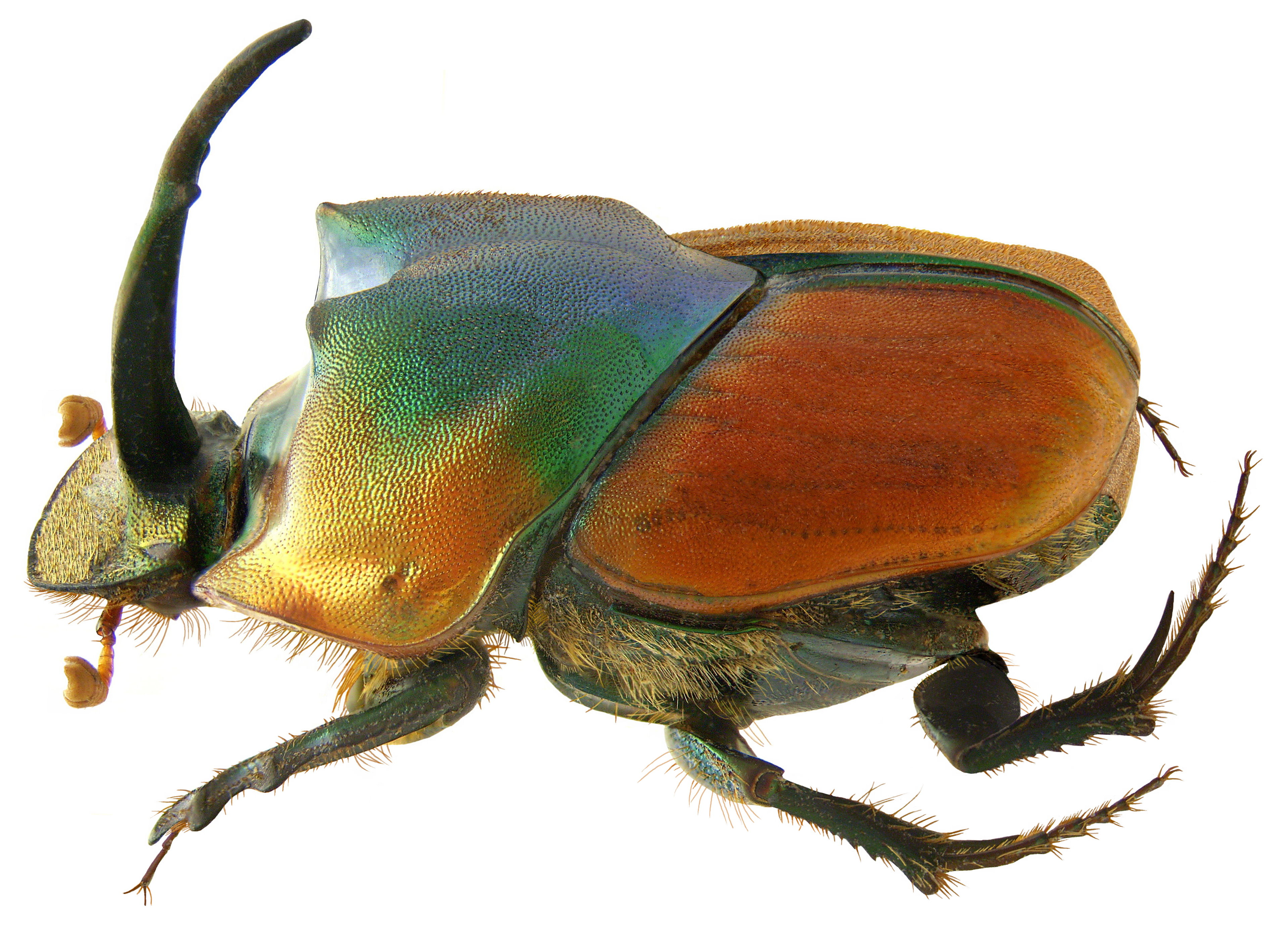
- male

Scientific classification
- Kingdom: Animalia
- Phylum: Arthropoda
- Clade: Pancrustacea
- Class: Insecta
- Order: Coleoptera
- Suborder: Polyphaga
- Infraorder: Scarabaeiformia
- Family: Scarabaeidae
- Genus: Proagoderus
- Species: P. pactolus

Binomial name
- Proagoderus pactolus (Fabricius, 1787)

Synonyms
- Scarabaeus pactolus Fabricius, 1787

= Proagoderus pactolus =

Species of beetle

Proagoderus pactolus, is a species of dung beetle found in India and Sri Lanka.
