= Endrodius =

Scientific classification
- Domain: Eukaryota
- Kingdom: Animalia
- Phylum: Arthropoda
- Class: Insecta
- Order: Coleoptera
- Suborder: Polyphaga
- Infraorder: Scarabaeiformia
- Family: Scarabaeidae
- Subfamily: Scarabaeinae
- Tribe: Onthophagini
- Genus: Onthophagus
- Subgenus: Endrodius; Balthasar, 1959

Subgenus of beetles

Endrodius is a subgenus of scarab beetles in the genus Onthophagus of the family Scarabaeidae. There are at least three described species in Endrodius. They are found in the Philippines.

== Species ==
These three species belong to the subgenus Endrodius:

- Onthophagus baeri Boucomont, 1914
- Onthophagus gaesatus Boucomont, 1925
- Onthophagus praedatus Harold, 1862
