= Amphionthophagus =

Scientific classification
- Domain: Eukaryota
- Kingdom: Animalia
- Phylum: Arthropoda
- Class: Insecta
- Order: Coleoptera
- Suborder: Polyphaga
- Infraorder: Scarabaeiformia
- Family: Scarabaeidae
- Subfamily: Scarabaeinae
- Tribe: Onthophagini
- Genus: Onthophagus
- Subgenus: Amphionthophagus; Martín-Piera & Zunino, 1983

Subgenus of beetles

Amphionthophagus is a subgenus of scarab beetles in the genus Onthophagus of the family Scarabaeidae. There are at least three described species in Amphionthophagus. They are found in the Palearctic.

== Species ==
These three species belong to the subgenus Amphionthophagus:

- Onthophagus falzonii Goidanich, 1926
- Onthophagus melitaeus (Fabricius, 1798)
- Onthophagus numidicus Orbigny, 1908
