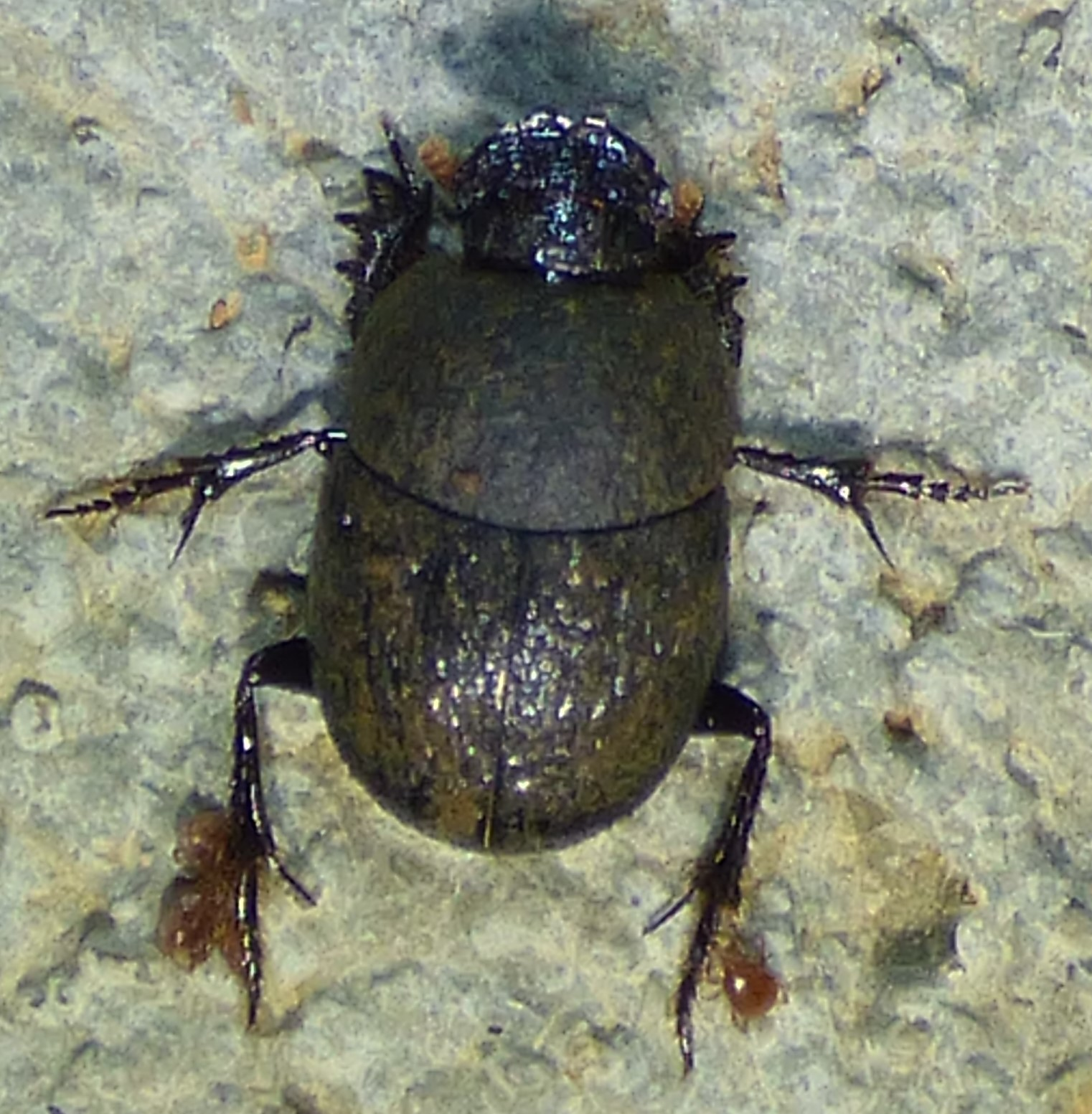
- Hamonthophagus depressus, South Carolina

Scientific classification
- Kingdom: Animalia
- Phylum: Arthropoda
- Class: Insecta
- Order: Coleoptera
- Suborder: Polyphaga
- Infraorder: Scarabaeiformia
- Family: Scarabaeidae
- Subfamily: Scarabaeinae
- Tribe: Onthophagini
- Genus: Hamonthophagus
- Species: H. depressus

Binomial name
- Hamonthophagus depressus (Harold, 1871)

Synonyms
- Onthophagus carteri Blackburn, 1904; Onthophagus depressus Harold, 1871; Onthophagus depressus marmoreus d'Orbigny, 1904; Onthophagus laceratus Peringuey, 1901

= Hamonthophagus depressus =

Species of beetle

Hamonthophagus depressus, the scarab beetle, is a species of scarab beetle in the family Scarabaeidae, found in Africa, Australia, and North America.
