= Onthophagiellus =

Scientific classification
- Domain: Eukaryota
- Kingdom: Animalia
- Phylum: Arthropoda
- Class: Insecta
- Order: Coleoptera
- Suborder: Polyphaga
- Infraorder: Scarabaeiformia
- Family: Scarabaeidae
- Subfamily: Scarabaeinae
- Tribe: Onthophagini
- Genus: Onthophagus
- Subgenus: Onthophagiellus; Balthasar, 1935

Subgenus of beetles

Onthophagiellus is a subgenus of scarab beetles in the genus Onthophagus of the family Scarabaeidae. There are more than 20 described species in Onthophagiellus. They are found primarily in Asia and Africa.

== Species ==
These 25 species belong to the subgenus Onthophagiellus:

- Onthophagus abei Ochi & Kon, 2015
- Onthophagus andonarensis Boucomont, 1914
- Onthophagus andreji Prokofiev, 2014
- Onthophagus crassicollis Boucomont, 1913
- Onthophagus deliensis Lansberge, 1885
- Onthophagus falculatus Boucomont, 1914
- Onthophagus hanboonsongae Masumoto, Ochi & Higurashi, 2021
- Onthophagus hidakai Ochi & Kon, 1995
- Onthophagus inermivertex Boucomont, 1921
- Onthophagus jugicola Orbigny, 1902
- Onthophagus kangeanus Paulian, 1936
- Onthophagus kapitensis Frey, 1971
- Onthophagus kawaharai Ochi & Kon, 2007
- Onthophagus kondaoensis Kabakov, 1994
- Onthophagus millingeni Orbigny, 1898
- Onthophagus opacifalculatus Ochi, Kon & Tsubaki, 2009
- Onthophagus parafalculatus Ochi, Kon & Tsubaki, 2009
- Onthophagus popovi Kabakov, 1983
- Onthophagus solmani Stebnicka, 1975
- Onthophagus suginokoichii Ochi & Kon, 2008
- Onthophagus sumatramontanus Ochi & Kon, 2008
- Onthophagus taiyaruensis Masumoto, 1977
- Onthophagus thanwaakhomus Masumoto, 1992
- Onthophagus tridentitibialis Ochi & Kon, 2008
- Onthophagus unguiculatus Kabakov, 1994
