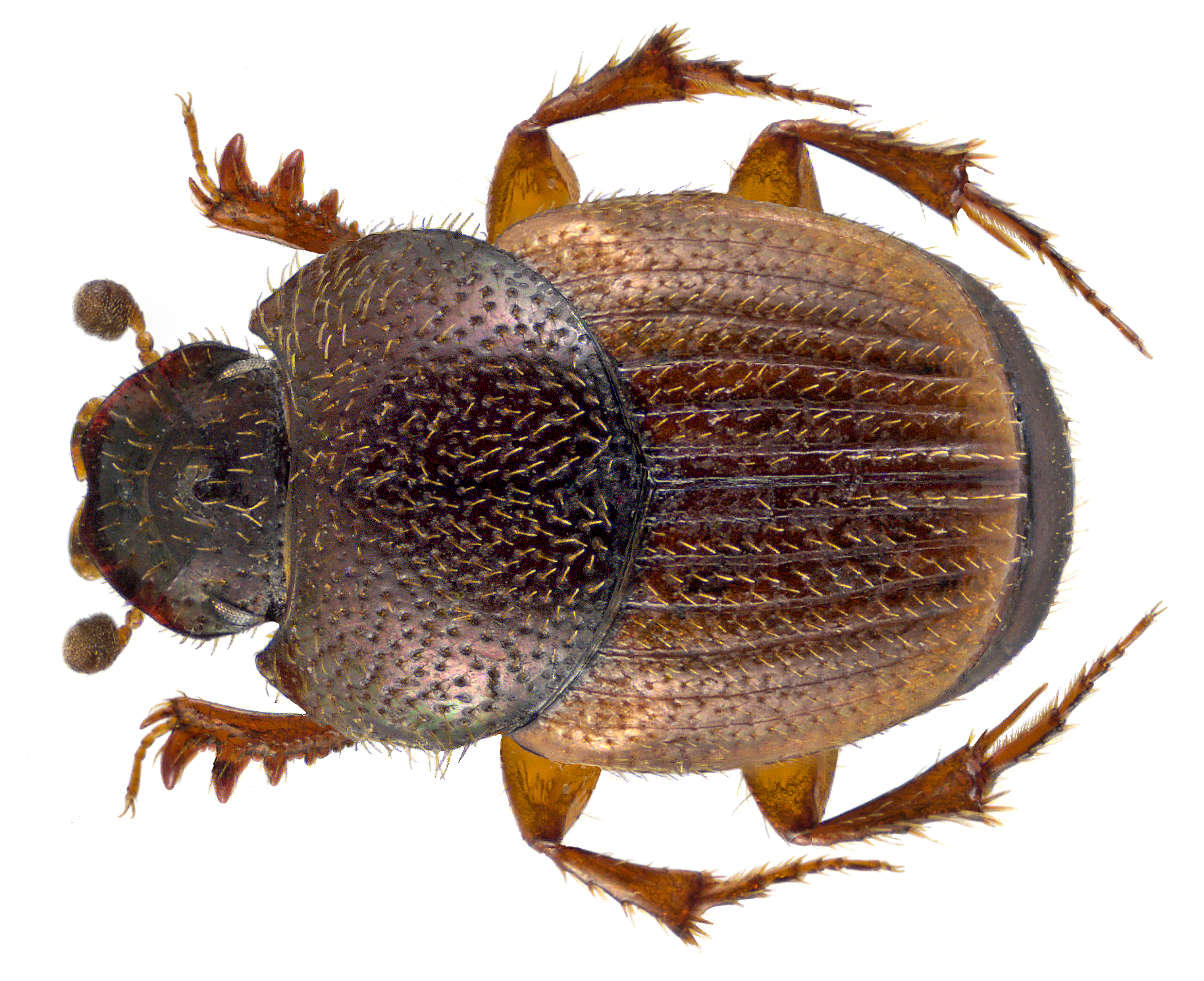

Scientific classification
- Kingdom: Animalia
- Phylum: Arthropoda
- Clade: Pancrustacea
- Class: Insecta
- Order: Coleoptera
- Suborder: Polyphaga
- Infraorder: Scarabaeiformia
- Family: Scarabaeidae
- Genus: Onthophagus
- Species: O. centricornis

Binomial name
- Onthophagus centricornis (Fabricius, 1798)

Synonyms
- Copris centricornis Fabricius, 1798; Copris luteipennis Wiedemann, 1823; Onthophagus minutus Motschulsky, 1858; Onthophagus promissus Harold, 1868

= Onthophagus centricornis =

Species of beetle

Onthophagus centricornis is a species of dung beetle found in India, Sri Lanka and Afghanistan. It is a small arboreal dung beetle inhabited in both dry and wet forests.

== Description ==
The species has a small body, broadly oval in shape and moderately convex, with an average length of about 2.5 to 3 mm. The male is smaller than female. Its body is black with a coppery lustre on the head and pronotum, and its elytra, legs, antennae, and mouthparts are orange or yellowish in color. The head is short and broad, with sparsely punctured clypeus. The pronotum is evenly, moderately strongly and closely punctured, the elytra are finely striate with flat intervals, and the pygidium is finely and not closely punctured. The beetle's metasternum possesses very few punctures in its middle, but more to its sides. Its legs are short, particularly the middle and hind tibia. They have eight segments in their antennae.

Males have a short, straight horn on their heads, and robust front tibia with four protruding teeth. In the female, the clypeus is separated from the forehead by a strongly curved carina.

Adults are frequently found from cow dung.
