= Onthophagus gravis =

Scientific classification
- Kingdom: Animalia
- Phylum: Arthropoda
- Clade: Pancrustacea
- Class: Insecta
- Order: Coleoptera
- Suborder: Polyphaga
- Infraorder: Scarabaeiformia
- Family: Scarabaeidae
- Genus: Onthophagus
- Species: O. gravis

Binomial name
- Onthophagus gravis Walker, 1858

Synonyms
- Onthophagus nietneri Harold, 1880

Species of beetle

Onthophagus gravis, is a species of dung beetle found in India, and Sri Lanka.
