= Onthophagus transcaspicus =

Scientific classification
- Kingdom: Animalia
- Phylum: Arthropoda
- Clade: Pancrustacea
- Class: Insecta
- Order: Coleoptera
- Suborder: Polyphaga
- Infraorder: Scarabaeiformia
- Family: Scarabaeidae
- Subfamily: Scarabaeinae
- Tribe: Onthophagini
- Genus: Onthophagus
- Species: O. transcaspicus

Binomial name
- Onthophagus transcaspicus Koenig, 1889

Synonyms
- Onthophagus lineatus Reitter, 1889; Onthophagus obsoletus Fairmaire, 1875

Species of beetle

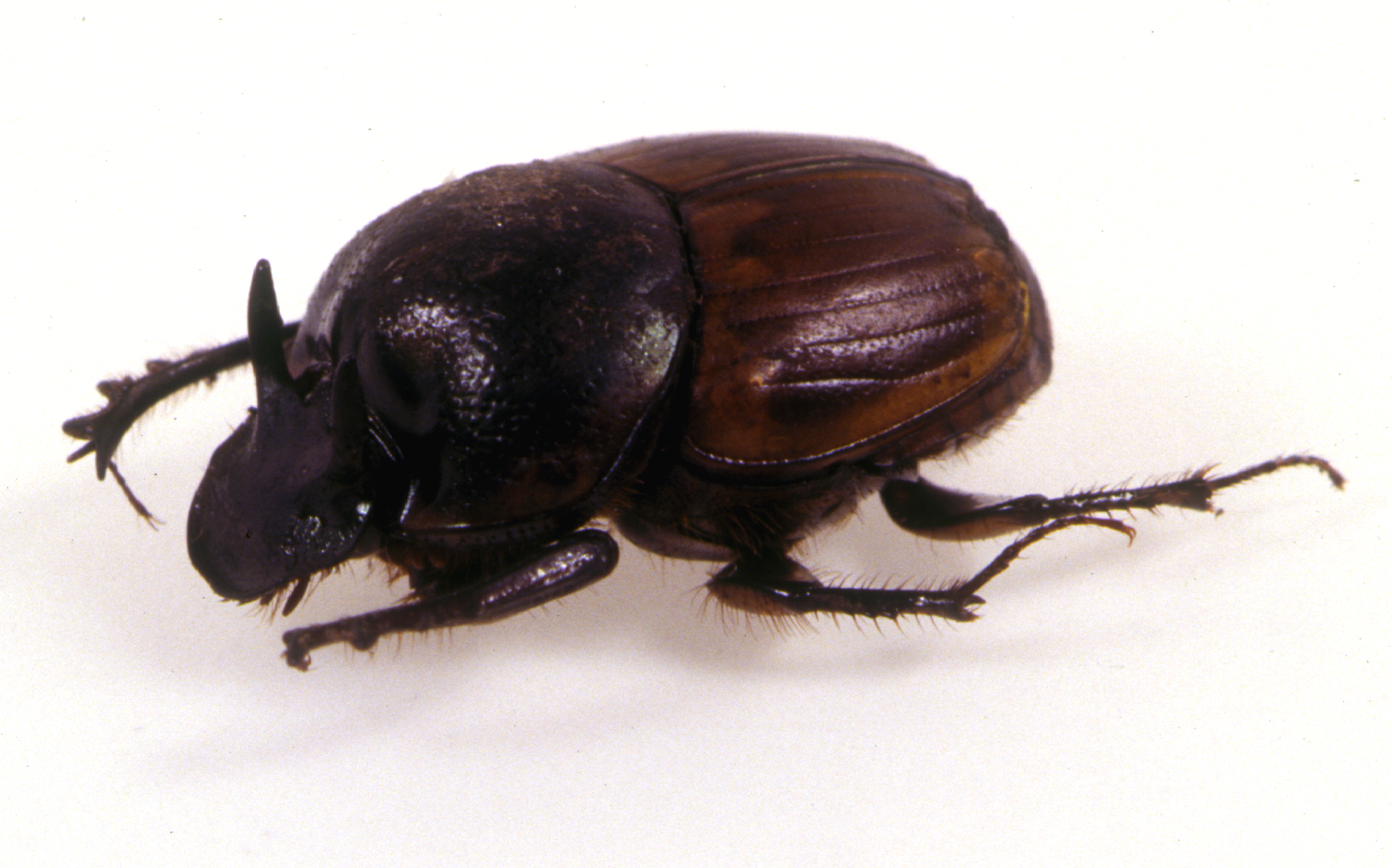

Onthophagus transcaspicus is a species of scarab beetle in the family Scarabaeidae. It is found in Africa and southwest Asia.

This species is sometimes referred to as the "gazelle scarab", as is Digitonthophagus gazella (formerly Onthophagus gazella).
