= Tiaronthophagus =

Scientific classification
- Domain: Eukaryota
- Kingdom: Animalia
- Phylum: Arthropoda
- Class: Insecta
- Order: Coleoptera
- Suborder: Polyphaga
- Infraorder: Scarabaeiformia
- Family: Scarabaeidae
- Subfamily: Scarabaeinae
- Tribe: Onthophagini
- Genus: Tiaronthophagus; Roggero, Moretto, Barbero & Palestrini, 2019

Genus of beetles

Tiaronthophagus is a genus of scarab beetles in the family Scarabaeidae. There are more than 20 described species in Tiaronthophagus, found in Africa.

== Species ==
These 26 species belong to the genus Tiaronthophagus:

- Tiaronthophagus aequatus (Péringuey, 1901) (Africa)
- Tiaronthophagus angolensis Roggero et al., 2019 (Angola)
- Tiaronthophagus chrysoderus (Orbigny, 1905) (Africa)
- Tiaronthophagus curtipilis (Orbigny, 1905) (Africa)
- Tiaronthophagus delahayei (Josso, 2011) (Zambia)
- Tiaronthophagus ebenus (Péringuey, 1888) (Africa)
- Tiaronthophagus flexicornis (Orbigny, 1902) (Africa)
- Tiaronthophagus hemichlorus (Orbigny, 1915) (Central African Republic)
- Tiaronthophagus jossoi Roggero et al., 2019 (Tanzania)
- Tiaronthophagus katanganus Roggero et al., 2019 (Republic Democratic Congo)
- Tiaronthophagus lamtoensis (Cambefort, 1984) (Africa)
- Tiaronthophagus liberianus (Lansberge, 1883) (Africa)
- Tiaronthophagus macroliberianus (Moretto, 2010) (Africa)
- Tiaronthophagus naevius (Orbigny, 1913) (Africa)
- Tiaronthophagus pendjarius (Josso & Prévost, 2006) (Africa)
- Tiaronthophagus pseudoliberianus (Moretto, 2010) (Africa)
- Tiaronthophagus rolandoi Roggero et al., 2019 (Africa)
- Tiaronthophagus rougonorum (Cambefort, 1984) (Africa)
- Tiaronthophagus rufobasalis (Fairmaire, 1887) (Africa)
- Tiaronthophagus rufopygus (Frey, 1957) (Africa)
- Tiaronthophagus rufostillans (Orbigny, 1907) (Africa)
- Tiaronthophagus saadaniensis Roggero et al., 2019 (Tanzania)
- Tiaronthophagus schaufussi (Harold, 1867) (Africa)
- Tiaronthophagus viridiaereus (Orbigny, 1908) (Africa)
- Tiaronthophagus zambesianus Roggero et al., 2019 (Africa)
- Tiaronthophagus zavattarii (Müller, 1939) (Ethiopia)
