= Onthophagus hystrix =

Scientific classification
- Kingdom: Animalia
- Phylum: Arthropoda
- Clade: Pancrustacea
- Class: Insecta
- Order: Coleoptera
- Suborder: Polyphaga
- Infraorder: Scarabaeiformia
- Family: Scarabaeidae
- Genus: Onthophagus
- Species: O. hystrix

Binomial name
- Onthophagus hystrix Boucomont 1914

Species of beetle

Onthophagus hystrix is a species of dung beetle found in India and Sri Lanka.
