= Onthophagus heterorrhinus =

Scientific classification
- Kingdom: Animalia
- Phylum: Arthropoda
- Clade: Pancrustacea
- Class: Insecta
- Order: Coleoptera
- Suborder: Polyphaga
- Infraorder: Scarabaeiformia
- Family: Scarabaeidae
- Genus: Onthophagus
- Species: O. heterorrhinus

Binomial name
- Onthophagus heterorrhinus Lansberge, 1885

Species of beetle

Onthophagus heterorrhinus, is a species of dung beetle found in India, Sri Lanka and Myanmar.

== Description ==
The species has an average length of about 4 mm.
