= Onthophagus gemma =

Scientific classification
- Kingdom: Animalia
- Phylum: Arthropoda
- Clade: Pancrustacea
- Class: Insecta
- Order: Coleoptera
- Suborder: Polyphaga
- Infraorder: Scarabaeiformia
- Family: Scarabaeidae
- Genus: Onthophagus
- Species: O. gemma

Binomial name
- Onthophagus gemma (Sharp, 1875)

Synonyms
- Caccophilus gemma Sharp, 1875

Species of beetle

Onthophagus gemma, is a species of dung beetle found in India, and Sri Lanka.
