= Altonthophagus =

Scientific classification
- Domain: Eukaryota
- Kingdom: Animalia
- Phylum: Arthropoda
- Class: Insecta
- Order: Coleoptera
- Suborder: Polyphaga
- Infraorder: Scarabaeiformia
- Family: Scarabaeidae
- Subfamily: Scarabaeinae
- Tribe: Onthophagini
- Genus: Onthophagus
- Subgenus: Altonthophagus; Kabakov, 1990

Subgenus of beetles

Altonthophagus is a subgenus of scarab beetles in the genus Onthophagus of the family Scarabaeidae. There are about 12 described species in Altonthophagus. They are found in the Palearctic and Indomalaya.

== Species ==
These 12 species belong to the subgenus Altonthophagus:

- Onthophagus cervenkai Kabakov, 2008
- Onthophagus concolor Sharp, 1878
- Onthophagus cupreiceps Arrow, 1907
- Onthophagus inelegans Balthasar, 1935
- Onthophagus kozlovi Kabakov, 1990
- Onthophagus kukunorensis Kabakov, 1990
- Onthophagus marmotae Kabakov, 1990
- Onthophagus sibiricus Harold, 1877
- Onthophagus tibetanus Arrow, 1907
- Onthophagus turpidoides Kabakov, 2008
- Onthophagus turpidus Reitter, 1887
- Onthophagus uniformis Heyden, 1886
