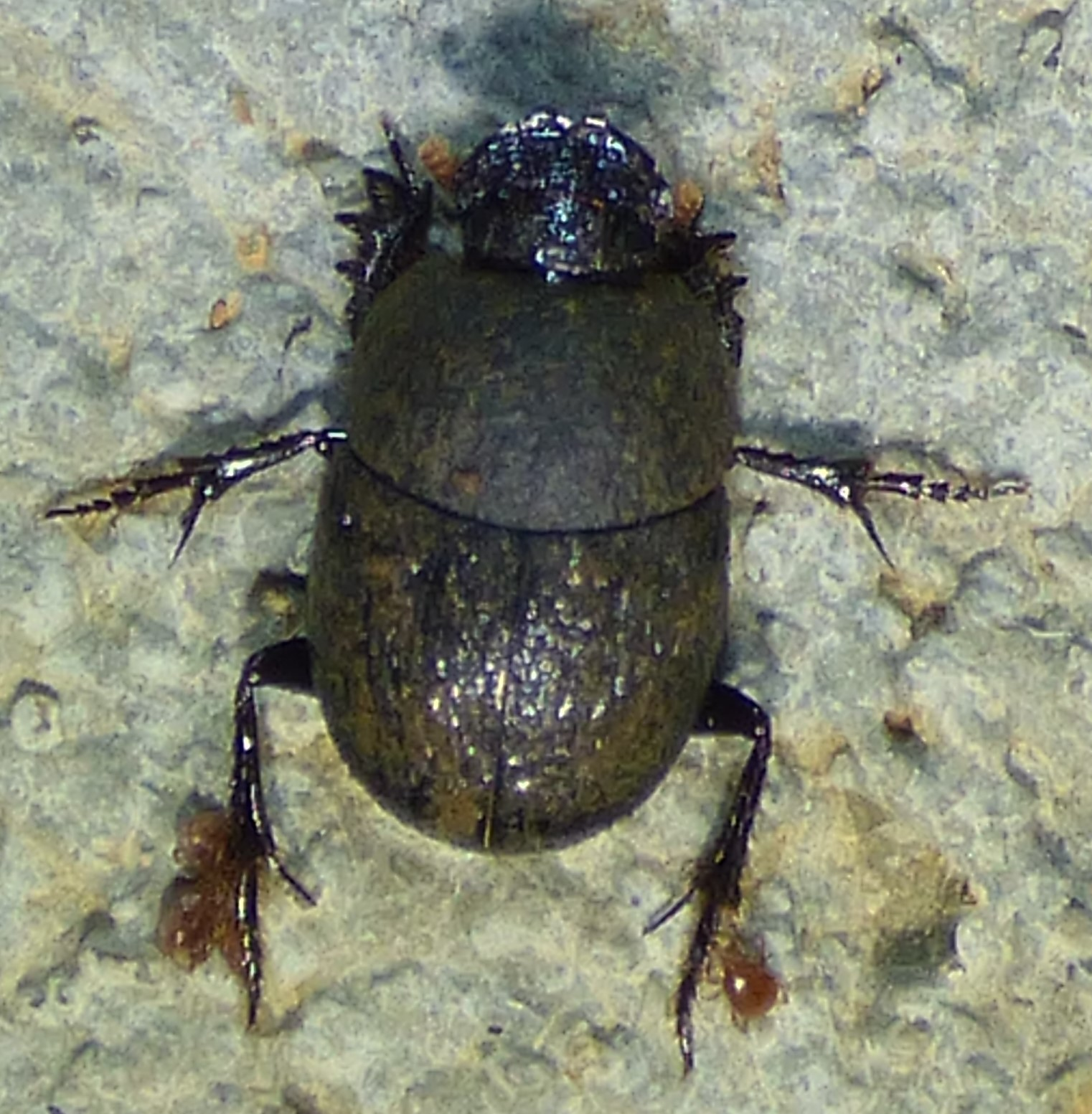
- Hamonthophagus depressus, Scarab beetle, South Carolina

Scientific classification
- Domain: Eukaryota
- Kingdom: Animalia
- Phylum: Arthropoda
- Class: Insecta
- Order: Coleoptera
- Suborder: Polyphaga
- Infraorder: Scarabaeiformia
- Family: Scarabaeidae
- Subfamily: Scarabaeinae
- Tribe: Onthophagini
- Genus: Hamonthophagus; Roggero, Dierkens, Barbero & Palestrini, 2017

= Hamonthophagus =

Genus of beetles

Hamonthophagus is a genus of scarab beetles in the family Scarabaeidae. There are about five described species in Hamonthophagus.

== Species ==
These five species belong to the genus Hamonthophagus:

- Hamonthophagus acutus (Orbigny, 1908)
- Hamonthophagus bituberculatus (Olivier, 1789)
- Hamonthophagus depressus (Harold, 1871)
- Hamonthophagus fallax (Orbigny, 1913)
- Hamonthophagus laceratus (Gerstaecker, 1871)
