= Onthophagus falsus =

Scientific classification
- Kingdom: Animalia
- Phylum: Arthropoda
- Clade: Pancrustacea
- Class: Insecta
- Order: Coleoptera
- Suborder: Polyphaga
- Infraorder: Scarabaeiformia
- Family: Scarabaeidae
- Genus: Onthophagus
- Species: O. falsus

Binomial name
- Onthophagus falsus Gillet, 1925

Synonyms
- Onthophagus cervus D'Orbigny, 1898

Species of beetle

Onthophagus falsus, is a species of dung beetle found in India, Sri Lanka and Pakistan.

== Description ==
This broadly oval, medium convex species has an average length of about 5.5 to 7.5 mm. Male is smaller than female. Body shining black or dark brown. Head, pronotum, elytra and ventrum are coppery or greenish-black. Elytra decorated with orange markings. Antennae, mouthparts, femora, pygidium, and abdominal lateral sides are orange. There are minute pale yellow setae on dorsum. Head less broad, with round ocular lobes at the sides. Clypeus a little produced and the pronotum is strongly punctured. Elytra finely striate, with slightly convex and finely punctured intervals. Pygidium strongly and unevenly punctured. Metasternal shield sparsely punctured at the sides. Male has shiny head and bears large and small punctures. Clypeus produced to a blunt point. Pair of horns are very broad and directed backward. Horns possess a small sharp tooth. Female has rugosely punctured clypeus without shine.
