= Cleptocaccobius inermis =

Scientific classification
- Kingdom: Animalia
- Phylum: Arthropoda
- Class: Insecta
- Order: Coleoptera
- Suborder: Polyphaga
- Infraorder: Scarabaeiformia
- Family: Scarabaeidae
- Subfamily: Scarabaeinae
- Tribe: Onthophagini
- Genus: Cleptocaccobius
- Species: C. inermis

Binomial name
- Cleptocaccobius inermis (Arrow, 1931)

Synonyms
- Caccobius inermis Arrow, 1931

Species of beetle

Cleptocaccobius inermis, is a species of dung beetle found in India and Sri Lanka.
