= Onthophagus fuscopunctatus =

Scientific classification
- Kingdom: Animalia
- Phylum: Arthropoda
- Clade: Pancrustacea
- Class: Insecta
- Order: Coleoptera
- Suborder: Polyphaga
- Infraorder: Scarabaeiformia
- Family: Scarabaeidae
- Genus: Onthophagus
- Species: O. fuscopunctatus

Binomial name
- Onthophagus fuscopunctatus (Fabricius 1798)

Synonyms
- Copris fuscopunctatus Fabricius 1798

Species of beetle

Onthophagus fuscopunctatus, is a species of dung beetle found in India, and Sri Lanka.

== Description ==
This species has an average length of about 3 to 3.5 mm.
