= Onthophagus ludio =

Scientific classification
- Kingdom: Animalia
- Phylum: Arthropoda
- Clade: Pancrustacea
- Class: Insecta
- Order: Coleoptera
- Suborder: Polyphaga
- Infraorder: Scarabaeiformia
- Family: Scarabaeidae
- Genus: Onthophagus
- Species: O. ludio

Binomial name
- Onthophagus ludio Boucomont, 1914

Species of beetle

Onthophagus ludio, is a species of dung beetle found in India, and Sri Lanka.
