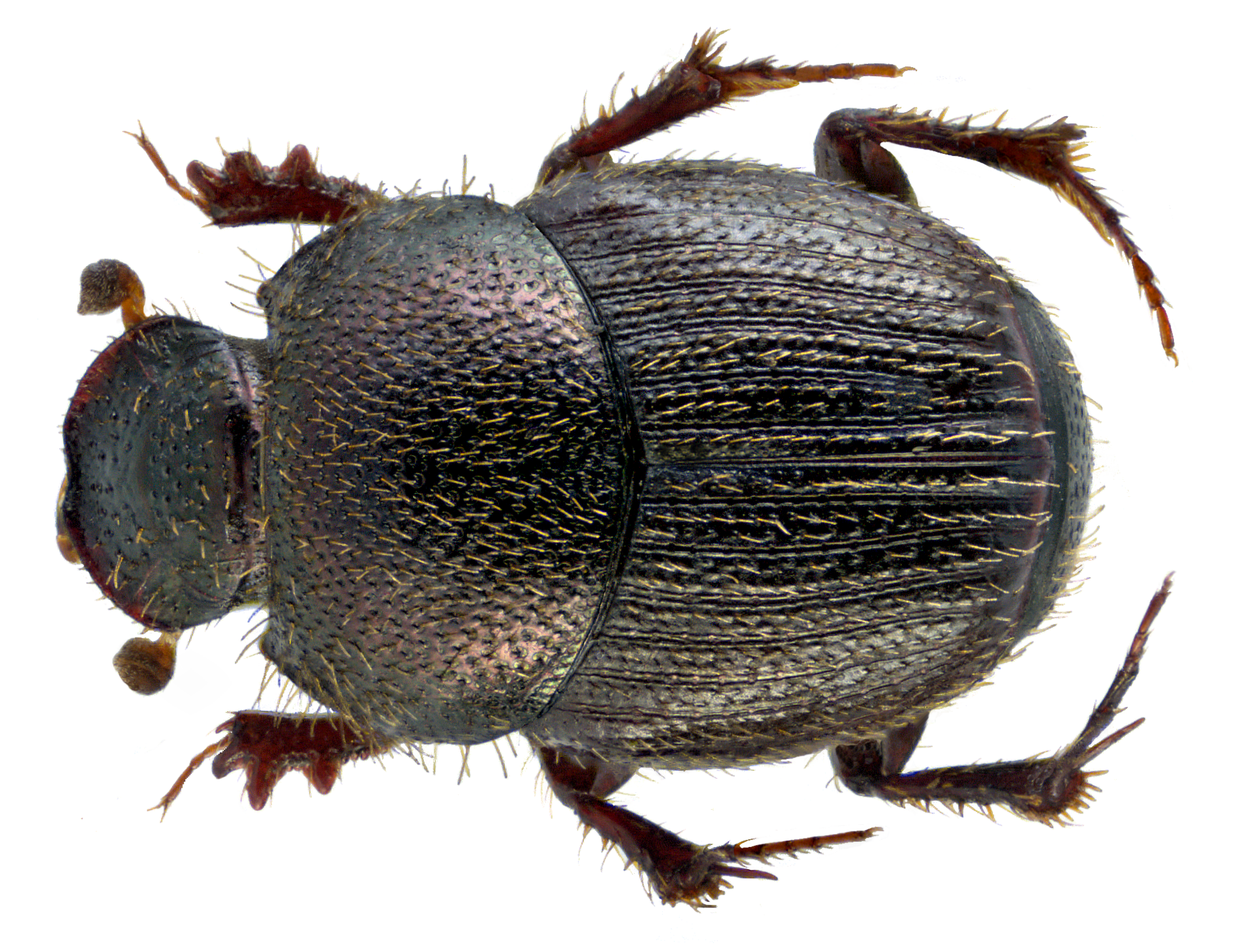
- male

Scientific classification
- Kingdom: Animalia
- Phylum: Arthropoda
- Clade: Pancrustacea
- Class: Insecta
- Order: Coleoptera
- Suborder: Polyphaga
- Infraorder: Scarabaeiformia
- Family: Scarabaeidae
- Genus: Onthophagus
- Species: O. parvulus

Binomial name
- Onthophagus parvulus (Fabricius, 1798)

Synonyms
- Ateuchus parvulus Fabricius, 1798; Onthophagus rugosiceps Motschulsky, 1863

= Onthophagus parvulus =

Species of beetle

Onthophagus parvulus, is a species of dung beetle found in India, and Sri Lanka.
