= Anoctus =

Scientific classification
- Kingdom: Animalia
- Phylum: Arthropoda
- Clade: Pancrustacea
- Class: Insecta
- Order: Coleoptera
- Suborder: Polyphaga
- Infraorder: Scarabaeiformia
- Family: Scarabaeidae
- Tribe: Onthophagini
- Genus: Anoctus

Genus of beetles

Anoctus is a genus of Scarabaeidae; a scarab beetle in the superfamily Scarabaeoidea.
