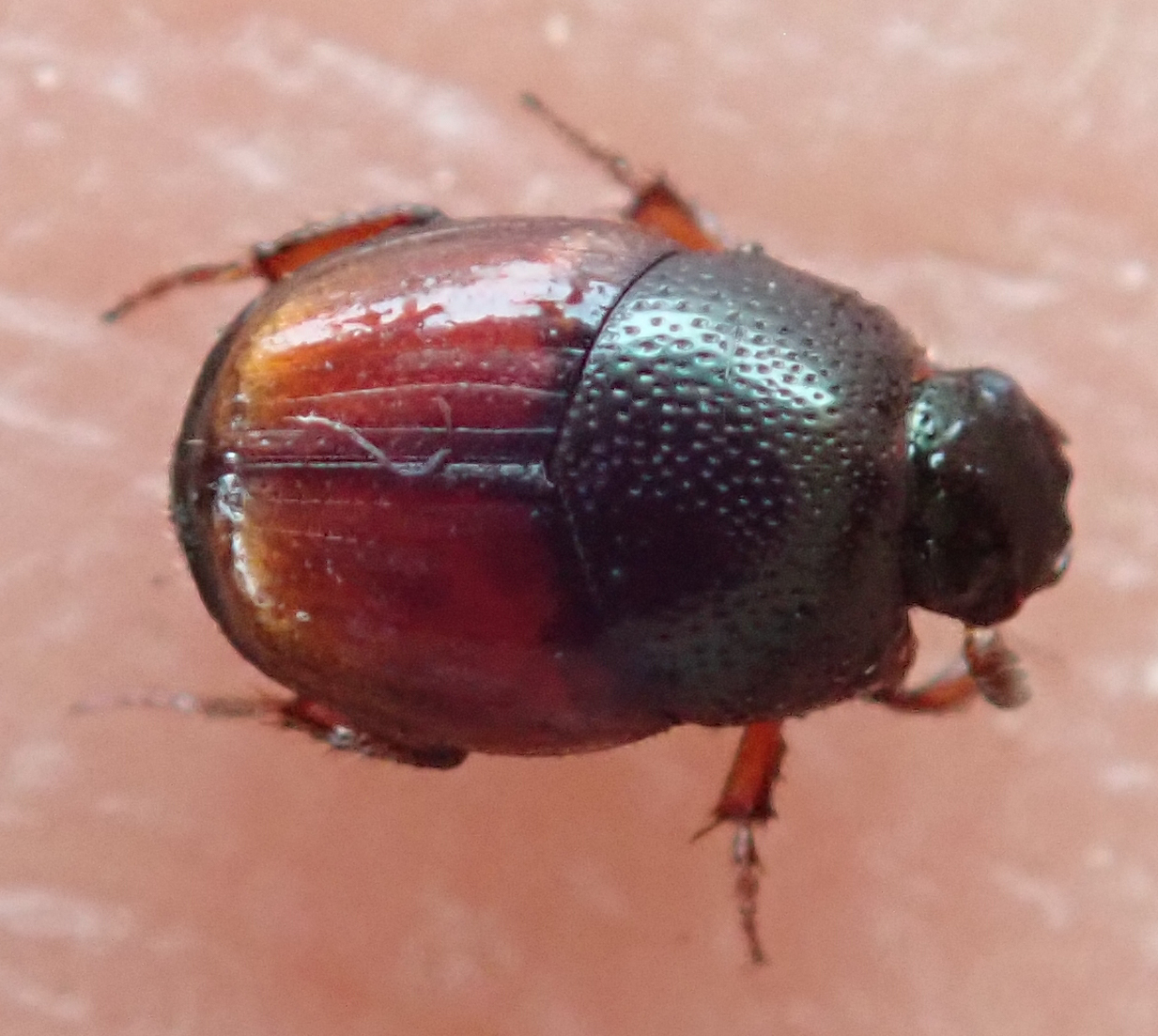
- Cleptocaccobius viridicollis, Botswana

Scientific classification
- Domain: Eukaryota
- Kingdom: Animalia
- Phylum: Arthropoda
- Class: Insecta
- Order: Coleoptera
- Suborder: Polyphaga
- Infraorder: Scarabaeiformia
- Family: Scarabaeidae
- Subfamily: Scarabaeinae
- Tribe: Onthophagini
- Genus: Cleptocaccobius; Cambefort, 1984

= Cleptocaccobius =

Genus of beetles

Cleptocaccobius is a genus of beetles in the family Scarabaeidae. There are more than 20 described species in Cleptocaccobius, found in Africa and Asia.

== Species ==
These 24 species belong to the genus Cleptocaccobius:

- Cleptocaccobius arrowi Cambefort, 1985
- Cleptocaccobius balthasarianus (Cambefort, 1979)
- Cleptocaccobius biceps (Orbigny, 1905)
- Cleptocaccobius boucomonti Cambefort, 1985
- Cleptocaccobius clementi (Cambefort, 1971)
- Cleptocaccobius convexifrons (Raffray, 1877)
- Cleptocaccobius dorbignyi Cambefort, 1984
- Cleptocaccobius durantoni Cambefort, 1985
- Cleptocaccobius humilis (Orbigny, 1902)
- Cleptocaccobius inermis (Arrow, 1931)
- Cleptocaccobius khatimae Cambefort, 1985
- Cleptocaccobius lamottei (Cambefort, 1983)
- Cleptocaccobius minor (Walter & Cambefort, 1977)
- Cleptocaccobius morettoi Josso & Prévost, 2006
- Cleptocaccobius postlutatus (Orbigny, 1905)
- Cleptocaccobius schaedlei (Orbigny, 1902)
- Cleptocaccobius scrofa (Balthasar, 1942)
- Cleptocaccobius semiluteus (Orbigny, 1905)
- Cleptocaccobius seminulum (Klug, 1855)
- Cleptocaccobius signaticollis (Orbigny, 1902)
- Cleptocaccobius simplex (Boucomont, 1923)
- Cleptocaccobius uniseries (Orbigny, 1905)
- Cleptocaccobius viridicollis (Fåhraeus, 1857)
- Cleptocaccobius youngai (Balthasar, 1967)
