= Sukelus =

Sukelus jessopi

Scientific classification
- Kingdom: Animalia
- Phylum: Arthropoda
- Class: Insecta
- Order: Coleoptera
- Suborder: Polyphaga
- Infraorder: Scarabaeiformia
- Family: Scarabaeidae
- Genus: Sukelus
- Species: S. jessopi

Binomial name
- Sukelus jessopi Branco, 1992

Synonyms
- Falcidius Branco, 1992 (homonym)

Genus of beetles

Sukelus is a genus of Scarabaeidae or scarab beetles in the tribe Onthophagini, containing the single species Sukelus jessopi.
