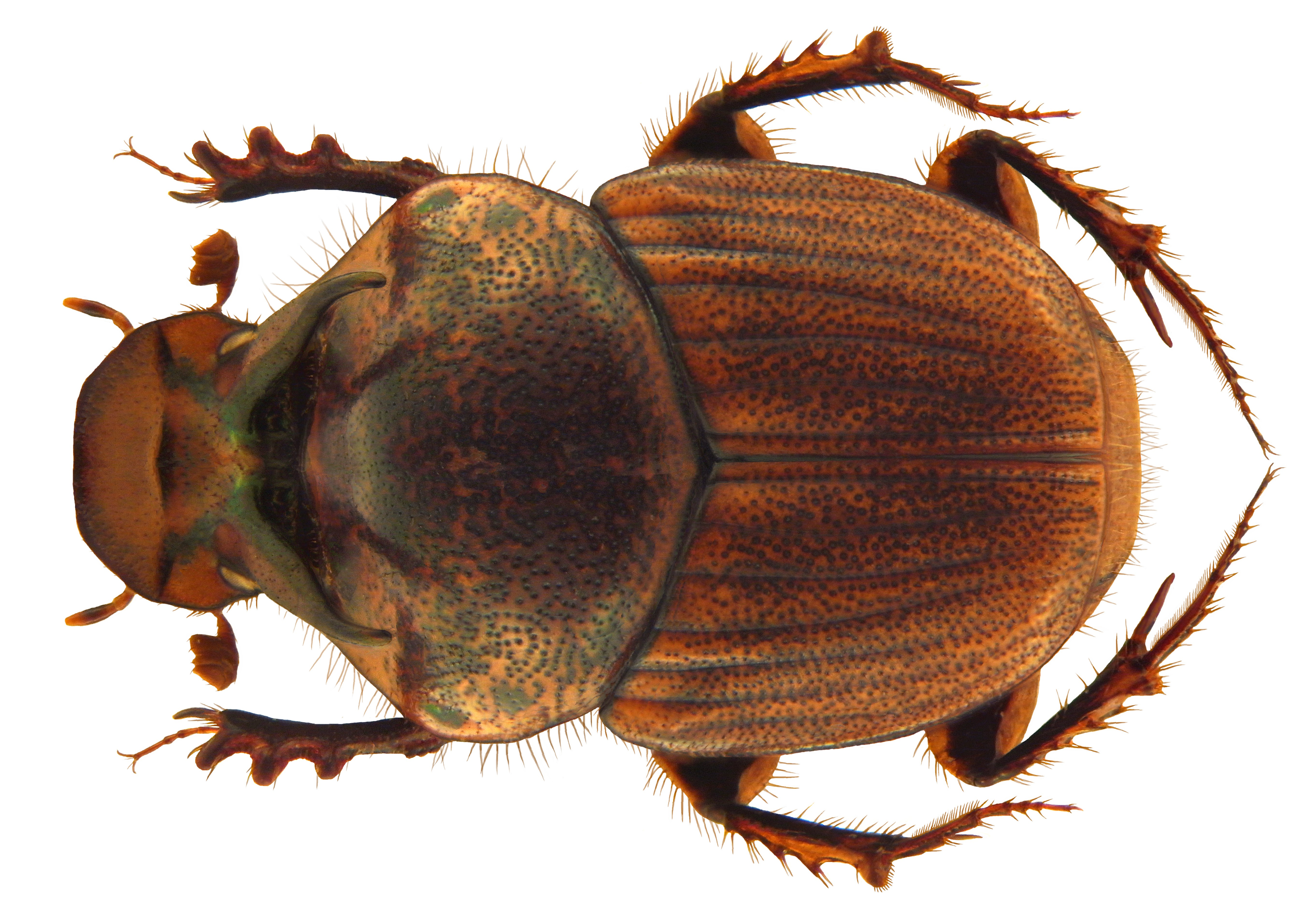
- male

Scientific classification
- Kingdom: Animalia
- Phylum: Arthropoda
- Clade: Pancrustacea
- Class: Insecta
- Order: Coleoptera
- Suborder: Polyphaga
- Infraorder: Scarabaeiformia
- Family: Scarabaeidae
- Genus: Onthophagus
- Species: O. rectecornutus

Binomial name
- Onthophagus rectecornutus Lansberge, 1883

Synonyms
- Onthophagus luridus Paulian, 1933

= Onthophagus rectecornutus =

Species of beetle

Onthophagus rectecornutus, is a species of dung beetle found in India, Sri Lanka, Nepal, China, Sunda Islands and Thailand.

== Description ==
This oval, very convex species has an average length of about 7 to 10 mm (0.28 to 0.39 in). Body testaceous yellow, with a faint metallic greenish shine and black mottling. Pygidium, punctures, margins, and sutures are black. Dorsum covered with very minute and inconspicuous greyish setae. Clypeus shortly semicircular in shape. Vertex bears a pair of unconnected horns which are sloping backwards. Pronotum strongly and irregularly punctured. Elytra deeply striate with fairly strongly and closely punctured intervals. Pygidium strongly punctured. Male has moderately closely punctured clypeus whereas female has closely transversely rugose clypeus.
