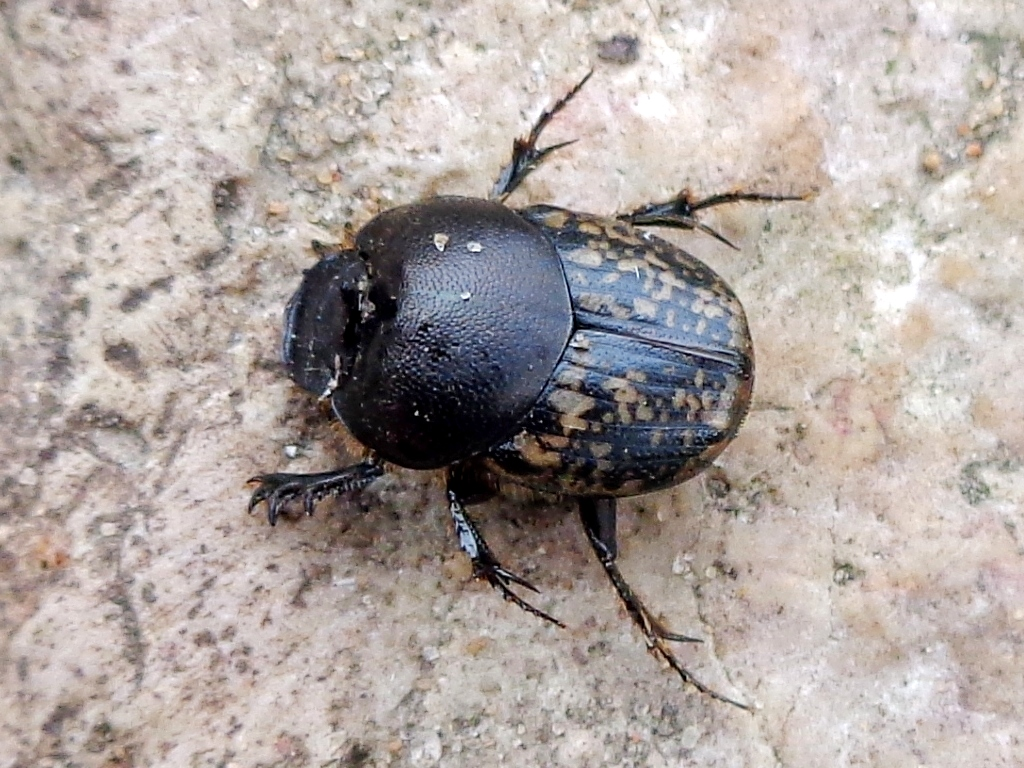

Scientific classification
- Kingdom: Animalia
- Phylum: Arthropoda
- Clade: Pancrustacea
- Class: Insecta
- Order: Coleoptera
- Suborder: Polyphaga
- Infraorder: Scarabaeiformia
- Family: Scarabaeidae
- Genus: Onthophagus
- Species: O. nuchicornis

Binomial name
- Onthophagus nuchicornis (Linnaeus, 1758)

Synonyms
- Onthophagus rhinoceros Melsheimer, 1845

= Onthophagus nuchicornis =

Species of beetle

Onthophagus nuchicornis is a species of dung beetle in the family Scarabaeidae. It is found in Europe and North America. Though Onthophagus nuchicornis is listed as "Vulnerable" in the United Kingdom, it is a common and abundant species in North America. It has been used as a model organism for ecotoxicological studies of ivermectin, where different biological endpoints (e.g. dung burial) are stimulated at low levels of ivermectin exposure, but impaired at high levels of ivermectin exposure.

Like other beetles within the genus, larva bulk-feed within subterranean brood balls, while adults consume the dead and living microbial biomass within the dung. This species can reproduce using the dung of various different North American mammals including: red fox, moose, and bobcat.
