= Euonthophagus =

Scientific classification
- Kingdom: Animalia
- Phylum: Arthropoda
- Class: Insecta
- Order: Coleoptera
- Suborder: Polyphaga
- Infraorder: Scarabaeiformia
- Family: Scarabaeidae
- Tribe: Onthophagini
- Genus: Euonthophagus

Genus of beetles

Euonthophagus is a genus of Scarabaeidae or scarab beetles in the superfamily Scarabaeoidea. It was considered a subgenus of Onthophagus by some authorities.
