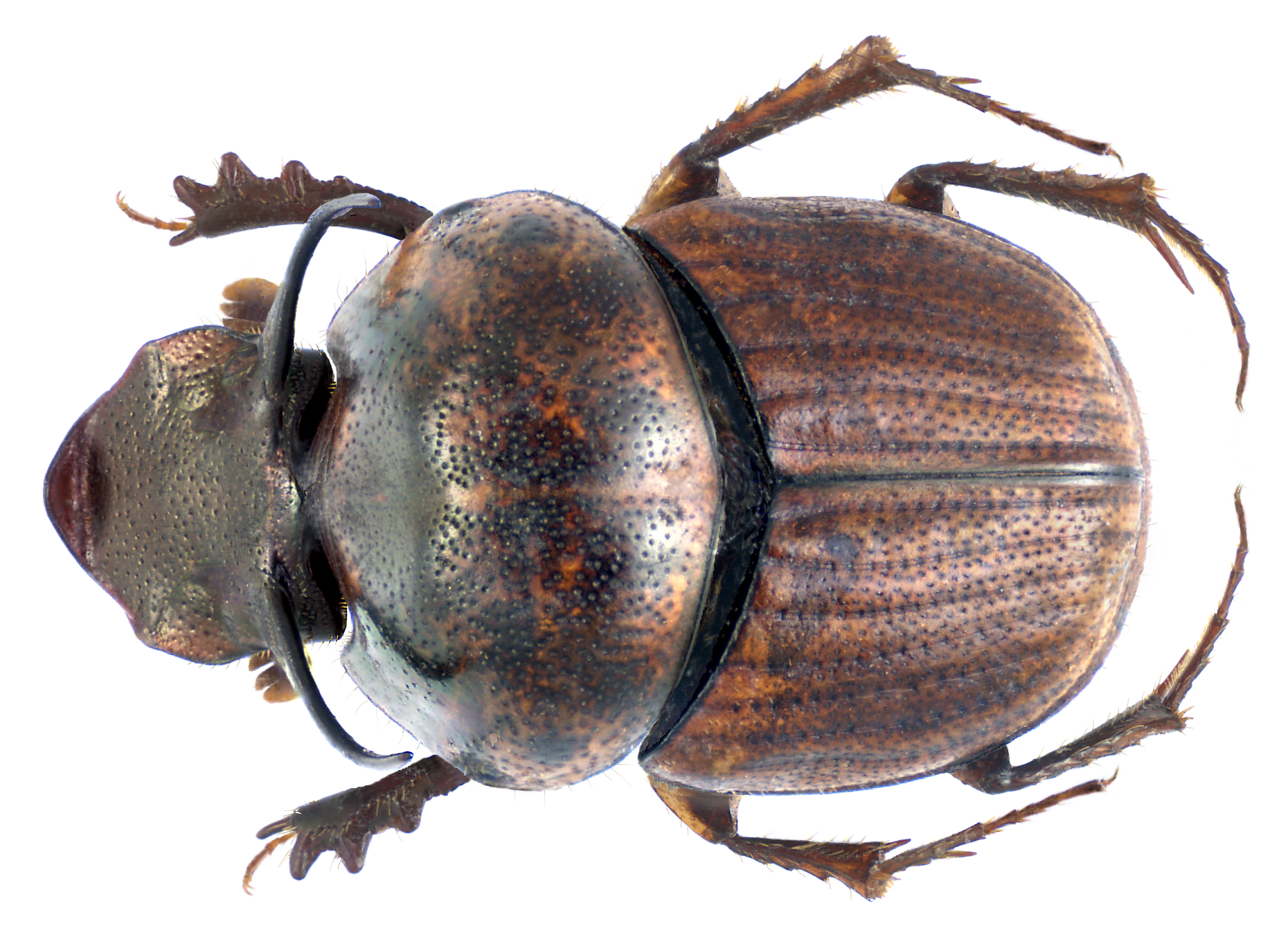

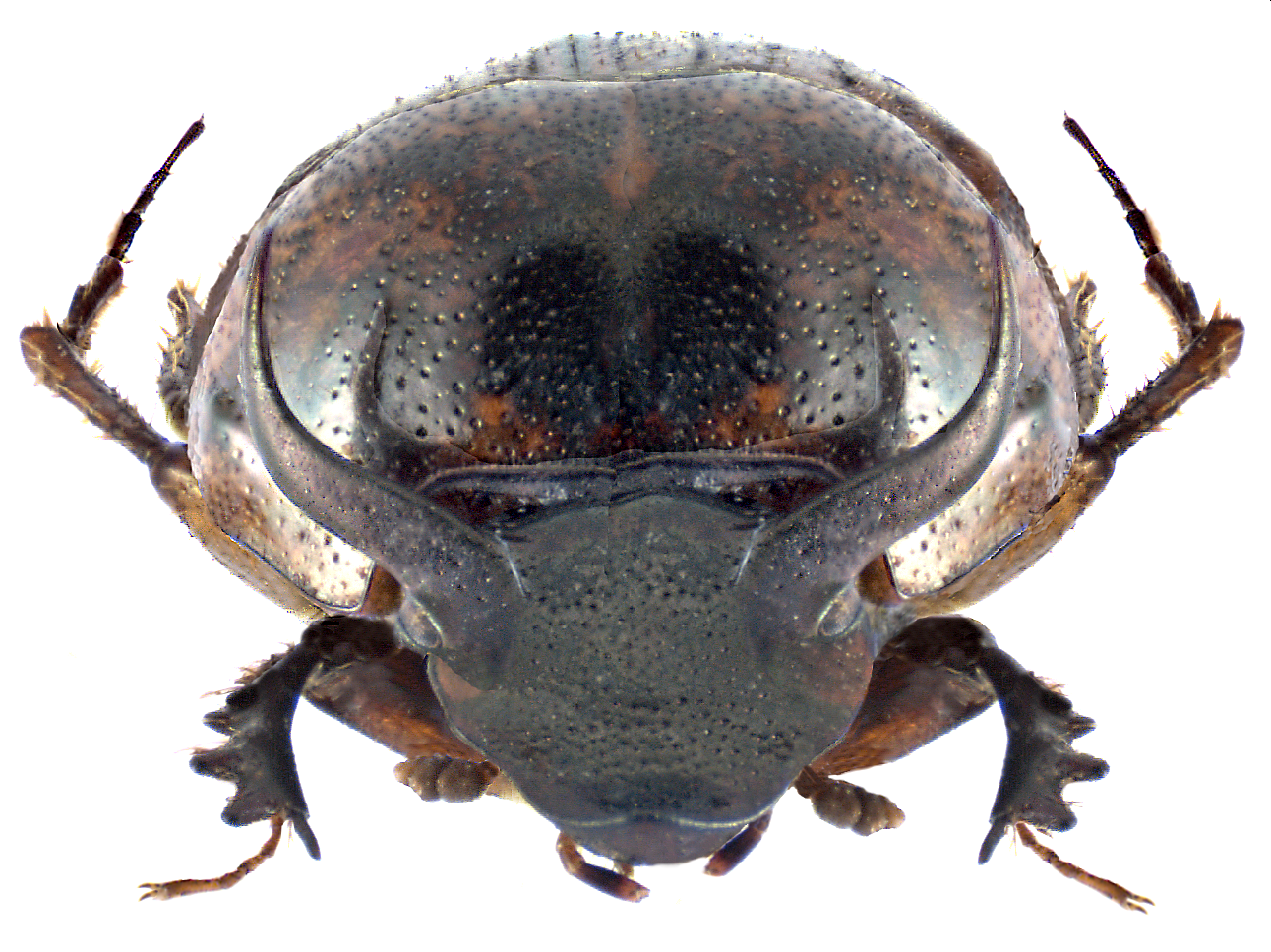

Scientific classification
- Kingdom: Animalia
- Phylum: Arthropoda
- Clade: Pancrustacea
- Class: Insecta
- Order: Coleoptera
- Suborder: Polyphaga
- Infraorder: Scarabaeiformia
- Family: Scarabaeidae
- Genus: Onthophagus
- Species: O. luridipennis

Binomial name
- Onthophagus luridipennis Boheman, 1858

Synonyms
- Onthophagus fuscopunctatus Lansberge, 1883; Onthophagus fuscopunctulatus Boucomont, 1914

= Onthophagus luridipennis =

Species of beetle

Onthophagus luridipennis, is a species of dung beetle found in India, Sri Lanka, Thailand, and Indonesia.

== Description ==
Average length is about 5.5 to 7.5 mm. Body yellowish-brown. Head and pronotum copper or bronze lustre. Male has a pair backwardly produced divergent horns. Female has longer vertex carina.

Adults have been found from feces of several domestic and wild species including cattle, buffalo, Javan surili, East Javan langur, Asian palm civet, and wild boar as well as humans.
