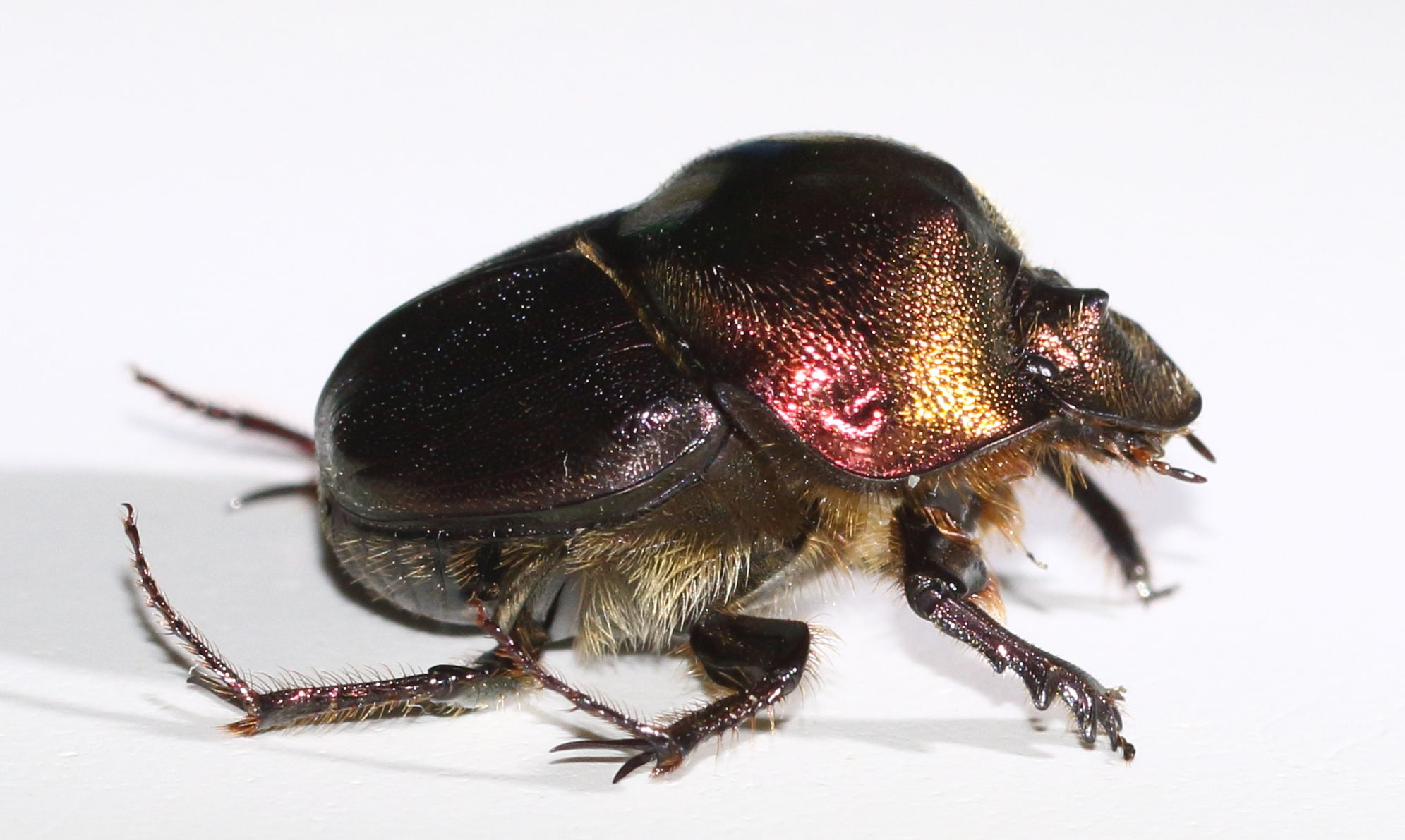
- Proagoderus chalcostolus

Scientific classification
- Kingdom: Animalia
- Phylum: Arthropoda
- Class: Insecta
- Order: Coleoptera
- Suborder: Polyphaga
- Infraorder: Scarabaeiformia
- Family: Scarabaeidae
- Tribe: Onthophagini
- Genus: Proagoderus

= Proagoderus =

Genus of beetles

Proagoderus is a genus of Scarabaeidae or scarab beetles in the subfamily Scarabaeinae. It was considered a subgenus of Onthophagus by some authorities. It includes over 100 species native to Africa and Asia.
