= Disphysema =

Scientific classification
- Domain: Eukaryota
- Kingdom: Animalia
- Phylum: Arthropoda
- Class: Insecta
- Order: Coleoptera
- Suborder: Polyphaga
- Infraorder: Scarabaeiformia
- Family: Scarabaeidae
- Genus: Disphysema; Harold, 1873
- Species: D. candezei

Binomial name
- Disphysema candezei Harold, 1873

Species of beetle

Disphysema is a genus of Scarabaeidae or scarab beetles, containing a single described species, D. candezei.
