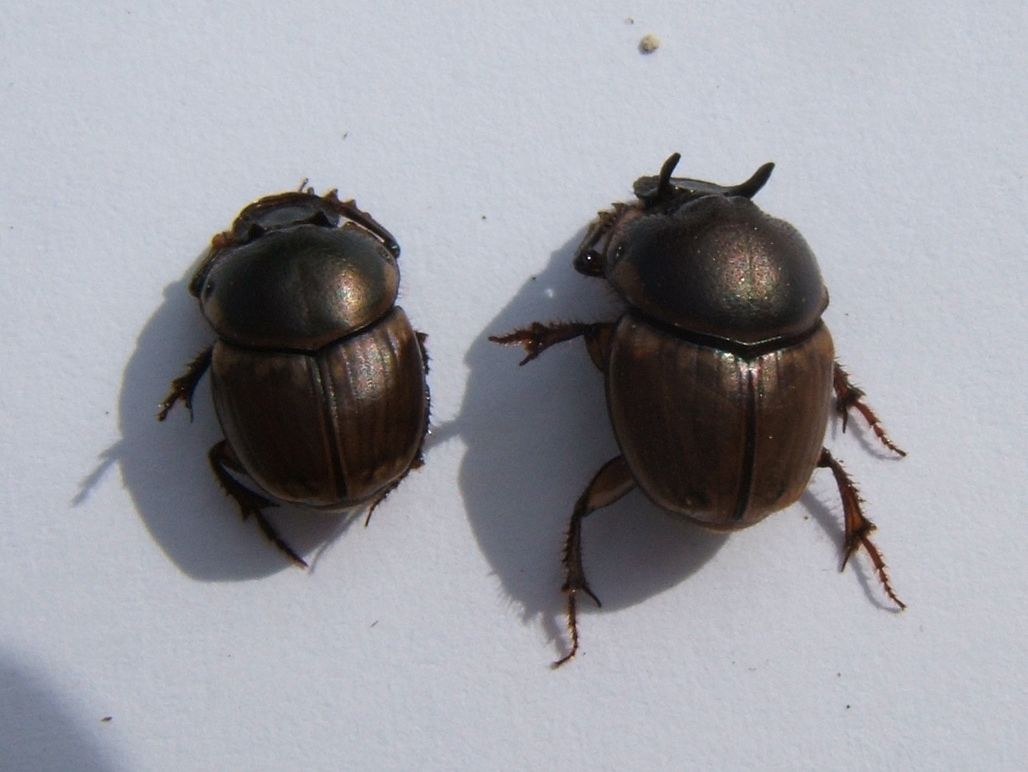
- Onthophagus gazella males; note variation in horn size

Scientific classification
- Kingdom: Animalia
- Phylum: Arthropoda
- Class: Insecta
- Order: Coleoptera
- Suborder: Polyphaga
- Infraorder: Scarabaeiformia
- Family: Scarabaeidae
- Subfamily: Scarabaeinae
- Tribe: Onthophagini; Lacordaire, 1856

Genera
- 34, see text

Synonyms
- Alloscelini Janssens, 1946

= Onthophagini =

Tribe of beetles

Onthophagini are a tribe of scarab beetles. Commonly placed in the true dung beetle subfamily (Scarabaeinae), it belongs to a group of subfamilies separated as subfamily Coprinae in some treatments.

Onthophagini often display sexual dimorphism, with the males having larger and more elaborate head and thorax ornaments, but not to the degree seen in the rhinoceros beetles of the scarab subfamily Dynastinae for example.

== Genera ==
Subtribe Alloscelina Janssens, 1949

- Alloscelus
- Haroldus
- Megaponerophilus

Subtribe Undefined

- Amietina
- Anoctus
- Caccobius Thompson, 1859
- Cambefortius
- Cassolus
- Cleptocaccobius
- Cyobius
- Diastellopalpus
- Digitonthophagus
- Disphysema
- Dorbignyolus
- Euonthophagus Balthasar, 1959
- Eusaproecius
- Heteroclitopus
- Hyalonthophagus
- Krikkenius
- Milichus
- Mimonthophagus
- Neosaproecius
- Onthophagus Latreille, 1802
- Phalops
- Pinacopodius
- Pinacotarsus
- Proagoderus
- Pseudosaproecius
- Stiptocnemis
- Stiptopodius
- Stiptotarsus
- Strandius
- Sukelus
- Tomogonus
- Unidentus
- Walterantus
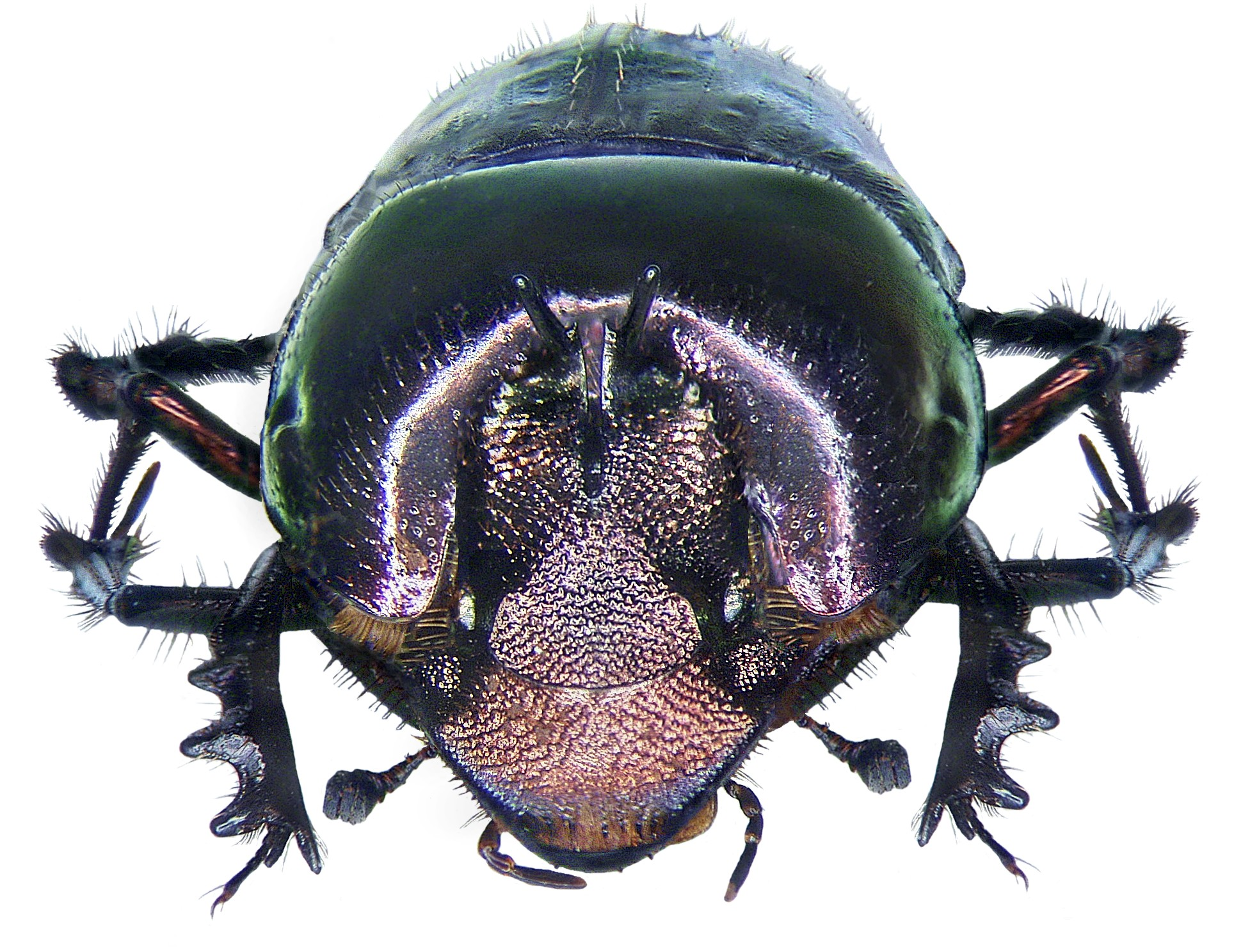
Phalops aurifrons
