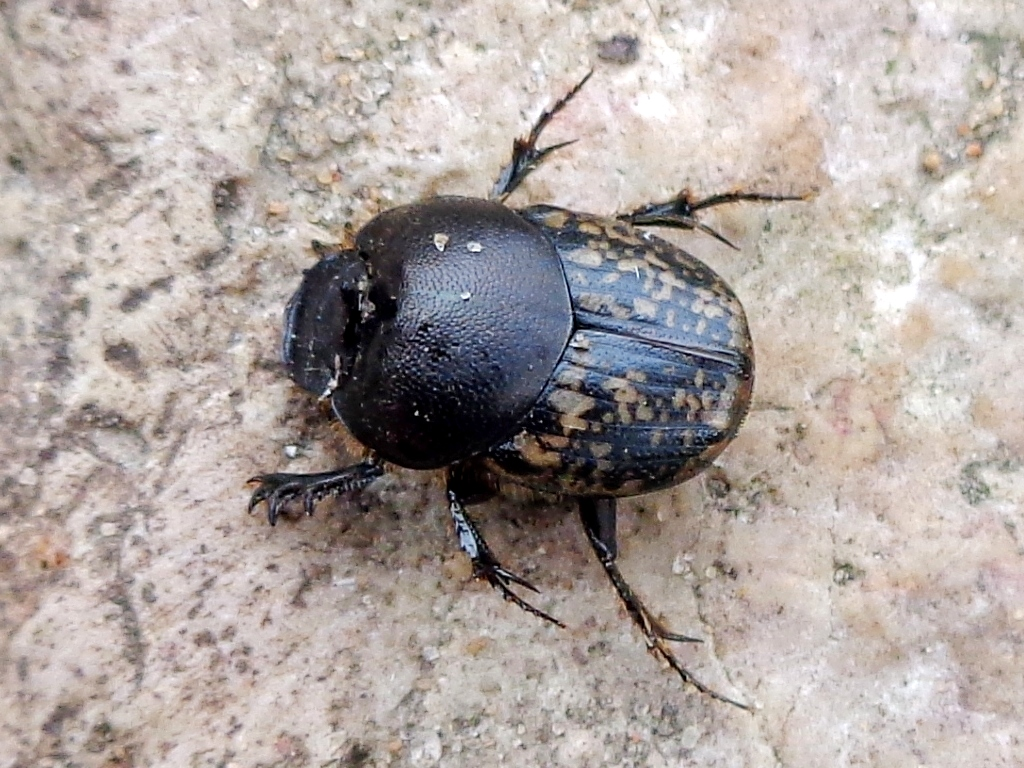
- Onthophagus nuchicornis

Scientific classification
- Kingdom: Animalia
- Phylum: Arthropoda
- Clade: Pancrustacea
- Class: Insecta
- Order: Coleoptera
- Suborder: Polyphaga
- Infraorder: Scarabaeiformia
- Family: Scarabaeidae
- Tribe: Onthophagini
- Genus: Onthophagus; Latreille, 1802

Synonyms
- Macropocopris Arrow, 1920; Pauronthophagus Blackwelder, 1844

= Onthophagus =

Genus of beetles

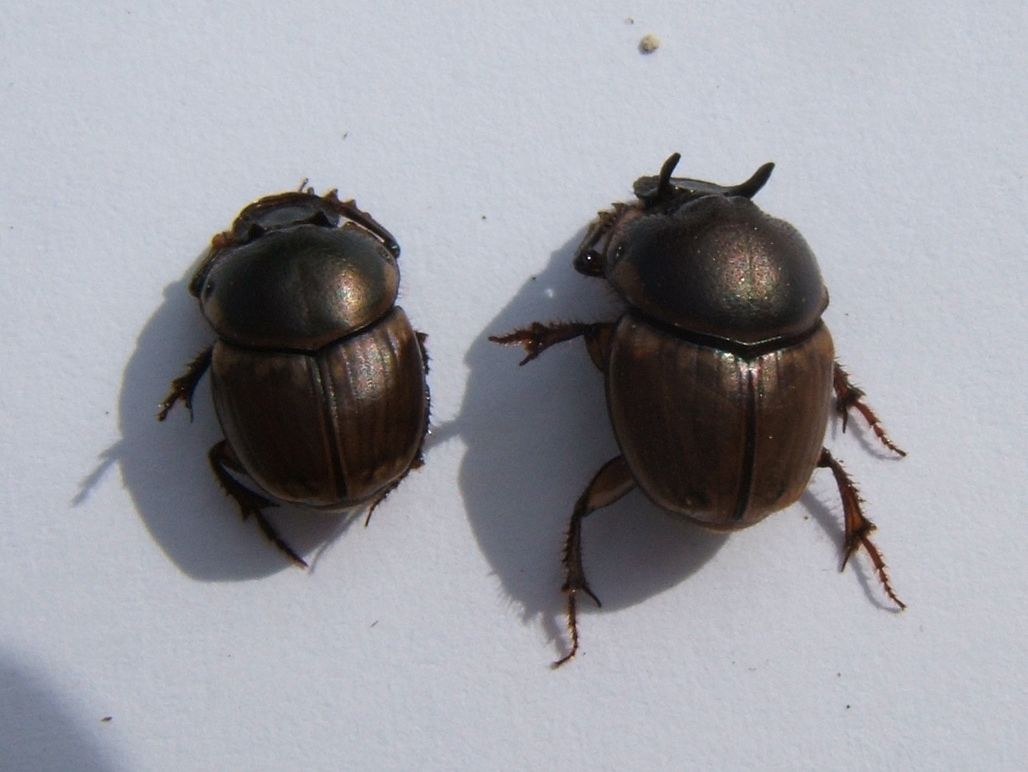
Gazella scarab (Onthophagus gazella) males; note variation in horn size

Onthophagus is a genus of dung beetles in the Onthophagini tribe of the wider scarab beetle family, Scarabaeidae. It is the most species-rich and widespread genus in the subfamily Scarabaeinae (the 'true' dung beetles), with a global distribution.

== Etymology ==
The Genus name derives from the Greek onthos, meaning dung, and phagos, meaning eater.

== Taxonomy ==
This genus includes around 30 subgenera and over 2,200 species. Some of the former subgenera of Onthophagus (including Proagoderus, Diastellopalpus, Digitonthophagus, and Euonthophagus) are now widely recognized as genera.

=== Subgenera ===
These subgenera are in accordance with the Catalog of Life and the World Scarabaeidae Database (2023).

- Afrostrandius Moretto, 2009 - tropical Africa
- Altonthophagus Kabakov, 1990 - Palearctic
- Amphionthophagus Martín-Piera & Zunino, 1983 - Palearctic
- Bicornonthophagus Tagliaferri & Moretto, 2012 - tropical Africa
- Colobonthophagus Balthasar, 1935 - Palaearctic, Oriental
- Cryptonthophagus Dierkens, 2022 - tropical Africa
- Drepanonthophagus Dierkens, 2022 - tropical Africa
- Endrodius Balthasar, 1959 - Oriental
- Eremonthophagus Zunino, 1979 - Palearctic
- Exonthophagus Kabakov, 2006 - Palearctic
- Furconthophagus Zunino, 1979 - Palaearctic, Oriental, tropical Africa
- Gibbonthophagus Balthasar, 1935 - Palaearctic, Oriental
- Gonocyphus Lansberge, 1885 - tropical Africa
- Hikidaeus Ochi & Kon, 2016 - Oriental
- Indachorius Balthasar, 1941 - Palaearctic, Oriental
- Indonthophagus Kabakov, 2006 - Palaearctic, Oriental, tropical Africa
- Macronthophagus Ochi, 2003 - Palaearctic, Oriental
- Matashia Matsumura, 1938 - Palaearctic, Oriental
- Micronthophagus Balthasar, 1963 - Oriental, Palaearctic, tropical Africa
- Onthophagiellus Balthasar, 1935 - Oriental
- Onthophagus Latreille, 1802 - worldwide
- Palaeonthophagus Zunino, 1979 - Palearctic
- Paraphanaeomorphus Balthasar, 1959 - Palaearctic, Oriental
- Parentius Zunino, 1979 - Palearctic
- Phanaeomorphus Balthasar, 1935 - Palaearctic, Oriental
- Pseudophanaeomorphus Ochi, 2007 - Oriental
- Serrophorus Balthasar, 1935 - Palaearctic, Oriental
- Sinonthophagus Kabakov, 2006 - Palearctic
- Strandius Balthasar, 1935 - Palaearctic, Oriental, tropical Africa
- Sunenaga Ochi, 2003 - Palaearctic, Oriental
- Trichonthophagus Zunino, 1979 - Palaearctic, Oriental, tropical Africa

== Gallery ==
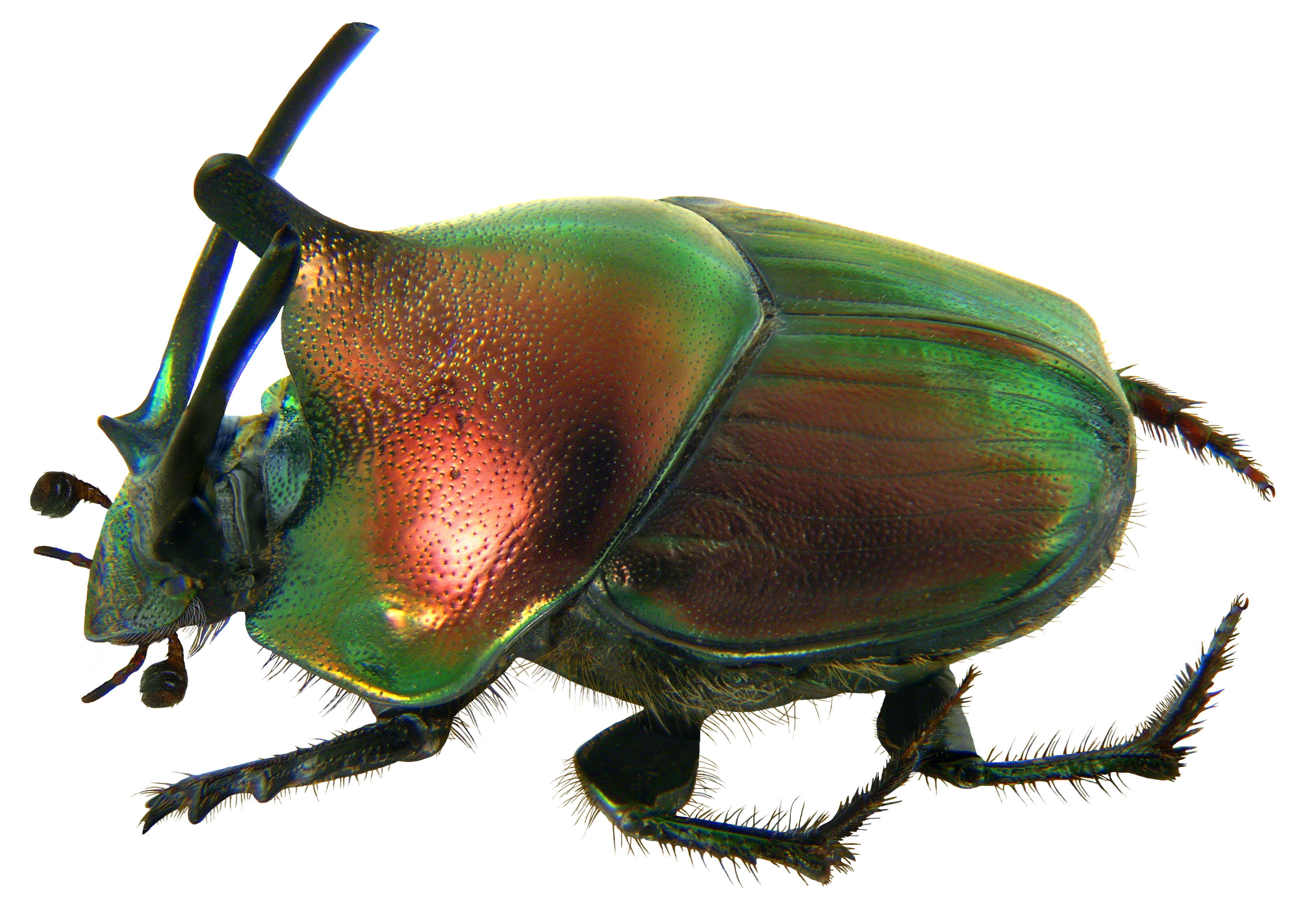
Onthophagus nigricornis

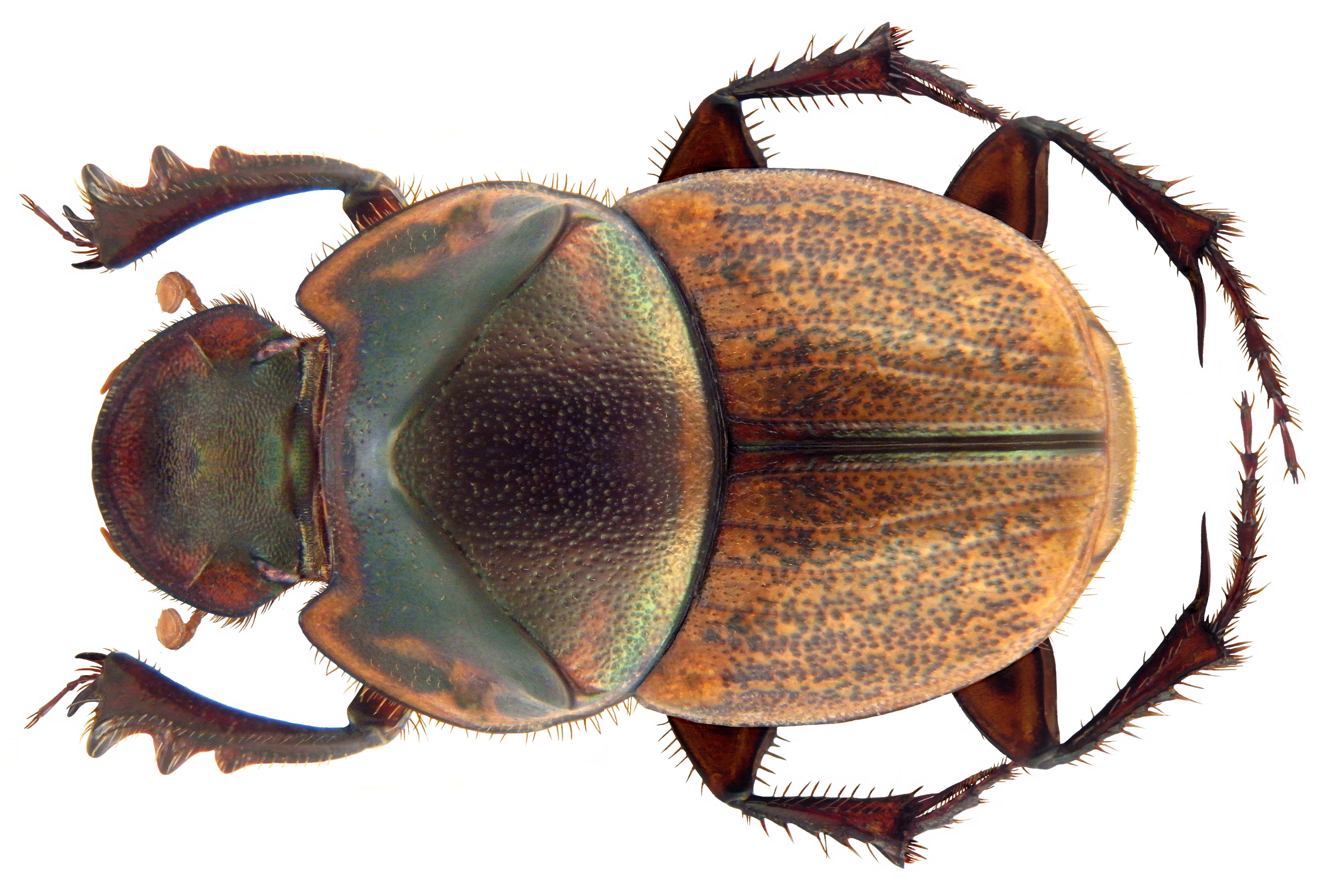
Onthophagus obliquus

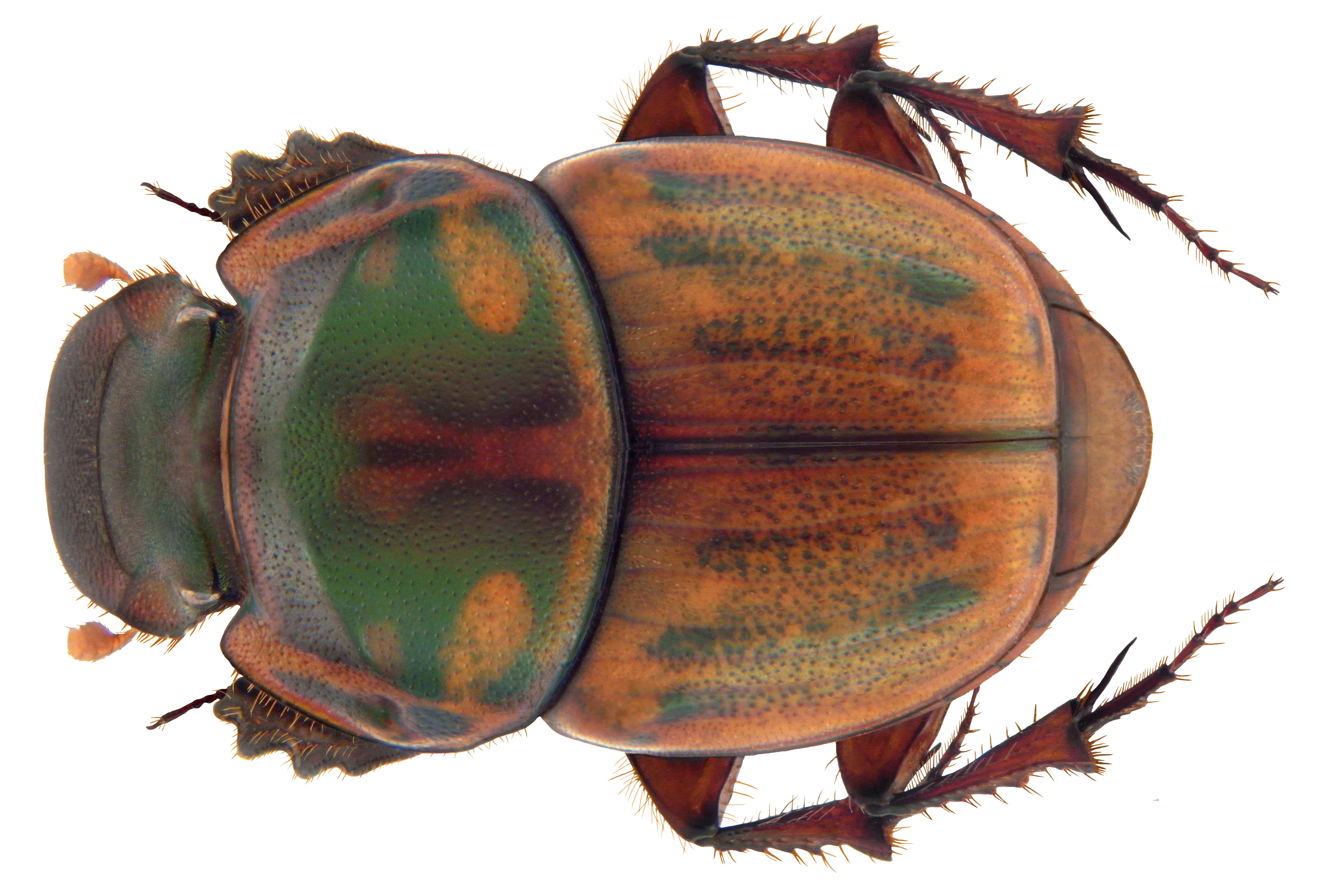
Onthophagus shimba

== See also ==
- List of Onthophagus species
