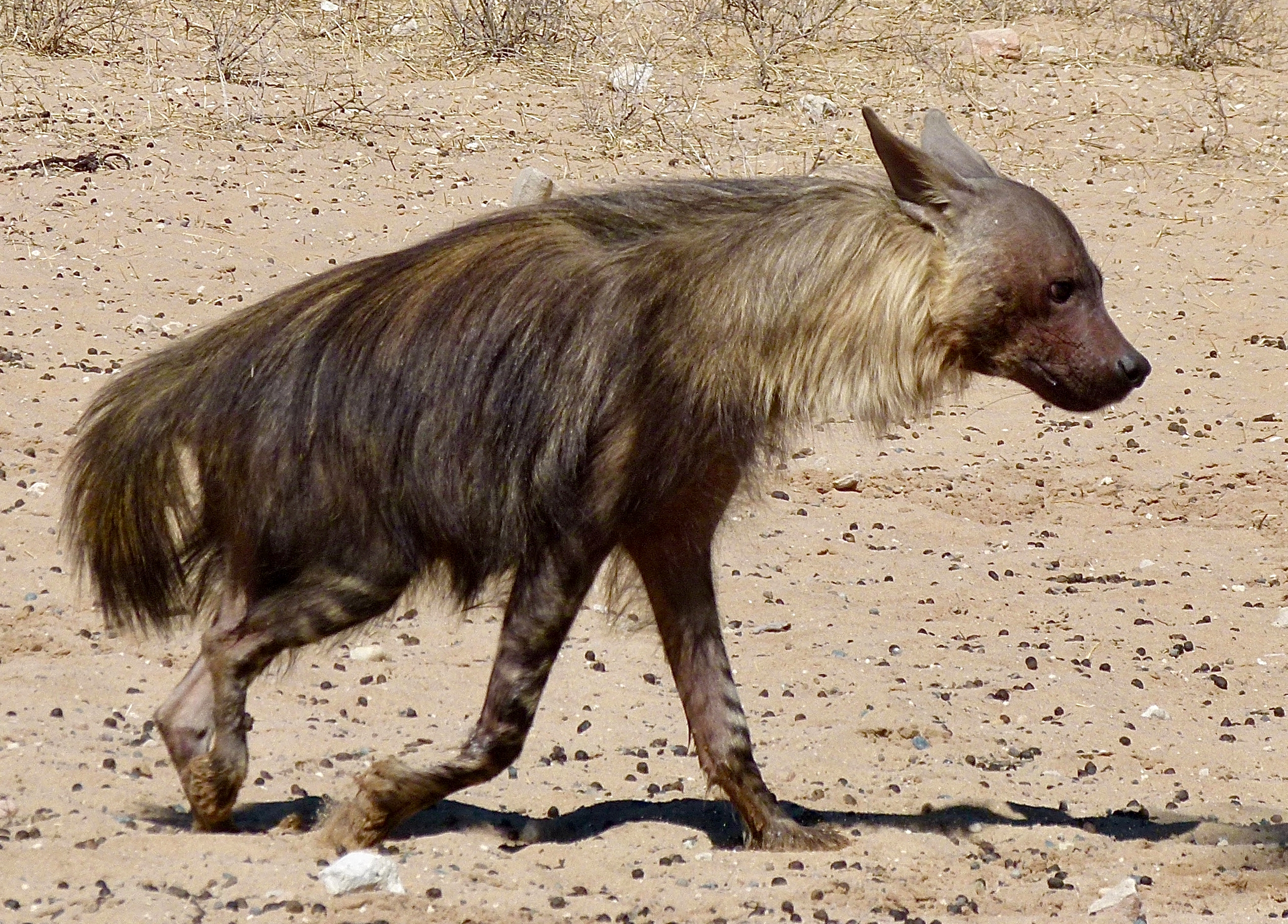
- At the Gemsbok National Park, South Africa

Conservation status
- Near Threatened (IUCN 3.1)

Scientific classification
- Kingdom: Animalia
- Phylum: Chordata
- Class: Mammalia
- Order: Carnivora
- Family: Hyaenidae
- Genus: Parahyaena; Hendey, 1974
- Species: P. brunnea

Binomial name
- Parahyaena brunnea (Thunberg, 1820)
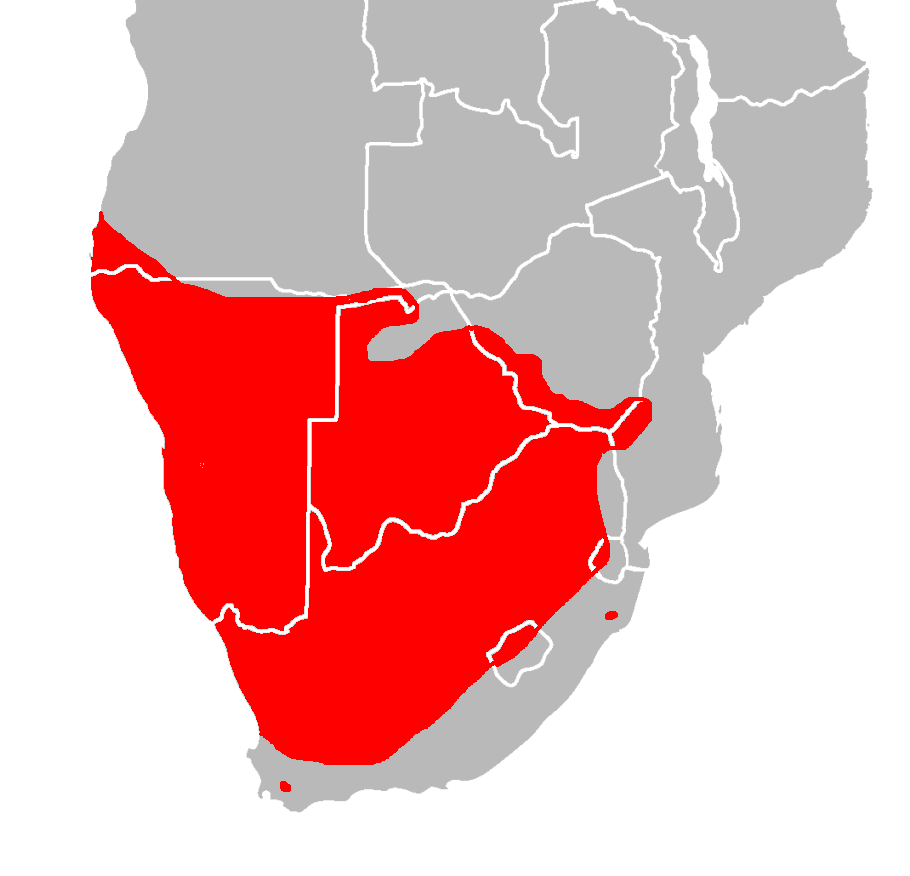
- geographic range

Synonyms
- Hyaena brunnea Thunberg, 1820; Hyaena fusca E. Geoffroy Saint-Hilaire, 1825; Hyaena striata A. Smith, 1826; Hyaena villosa A. Smith, 1827; Hyaena melampus Pocock, 1934

= Brown hyena =

Brown hyena Temporal range: Late Pliocene – Recent

Species of carnivore

The brown hyena (Parahyaena brunnea), also called the strandwolf, is a species of hyena found in Namibia, Botswana, western and southern Zimbabwe, southern Mozambique, western Eswatini, and South Africa. It is the only extant species in the genus Parahyaena. It is currently the rarest species of hyena. The largest remaining brown hyena population is located in the southern Kalahari Desert and coastal areas in Southwest Africa. The global population of brown hyena is estimated by IUCN at a number between 4,000 and 10,000 and its conservation status is marked as near threatened in the IUCN Red List.

== Description ==
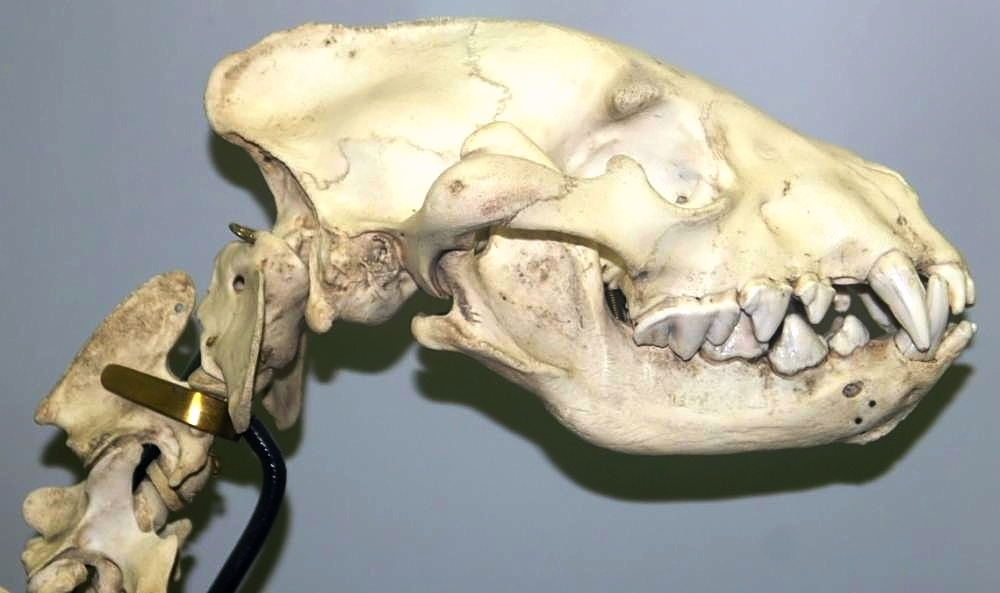
A skull at the National Museum of Natural History, National Mall in Washington, D.C.

Brown hyenas are distinguished from other species by their long shaggy dark brown coat, pointed ears, and short tail. Their legs are striped brown and white, and adults have a distinct cream-colored fur ruff around their necks. Erectile hairs up to 305 mm (12.0 in) in length cover the neck and back and bristles during agonistic behavior. Body length is 144 cm (57 in) on average with a range of 130–160 cm (51–63 in). Shoulder height is 70–80 cm (28–31 in) and the tail is 25–35 cm (9.8–13.8 in) long. Unlike the larger spotted hyena, there are no sizable differences between the sexes, although males may be slightly larger than females. An average adult male weighs 40.2–43.7 kg (89–96 lb), while an average female weighs 37.7–40.2 kg (83–89 lb). Brown hyenas have powerful jaws, and young animals can crack the leg bones of springboks in five minutes, though this ability deteriorates with age and dental wear. The skulls of brown hyenas are larger than those of the closely related striped hyena, and their dentition is more robust, indicating a more specialized dietary adaptation.

== Distribution and habitat ==
The brown hyena inhabits desert areas, semi-desert, and open woodland savannah in Southern Africa. In the Namib, it also lives near seal colonies and in abandoned diamond mining towns. It is not dependent on water sources for frequent drinking and favours rocky, mountainous areas, as these provide shade.

== Fossil record ==
Today, the brown hyena only inhabits Southern Africa, with the earliest known occurrence in the region during the Late Pliocene based on fossils from the Makapansgat-Member 3, dated to approximately 2.85 to 2.58 million years ago. It may have lived also in the Iberian Peninsula and perhaps in other parts of Europe, indicated by fossils found at Fonelas 1 near Granada dated to the Late Pliocene. It is uncertain whether the Fonelas hyena specimens are truly brown hyena. Early Pleistocene brown hyenas are known to have fed on hominins, though whether this constituted scavenging or active predation is unclear.

During the Middle Pleistocene, it inhabited what is now Kenya. Latrines made by brown hyenas have been discovered in South Africa dating back to the Middle Pleistocene. There is the possibility that Parahyaena may be synonymous with the extinct Pachycrocuta, making the brown hyena the only extant member of this genus. Other authors however do not support such a position.

== Ecology and behavior ==
In the Kalahari, 80% of a brown hyena's activity time is spent at night. They may cache excess food in shrubs or holes and recover it within 24 hours.

=== Social behavior ===
Brown hyenas maintain a stable clan hierarchy of four to six related individuals with a mated pair and their offspring; a male can move up in rank by killing a higher ranking male in confrontation, while the alpha female is usually just the oldest female in the clan. Clans defend their territory, and all members cooperate in raising cubs. Territories are marked by 'pasting' on vegetation and boulders, during which the hyena deposits secretions from its large anal gland, which is located below the base of the tail and produces a black and white paste. Emigration is common in brown hyena clans, particularly among young males, which join other groups upon reaching adulthood.

=== Diet ===
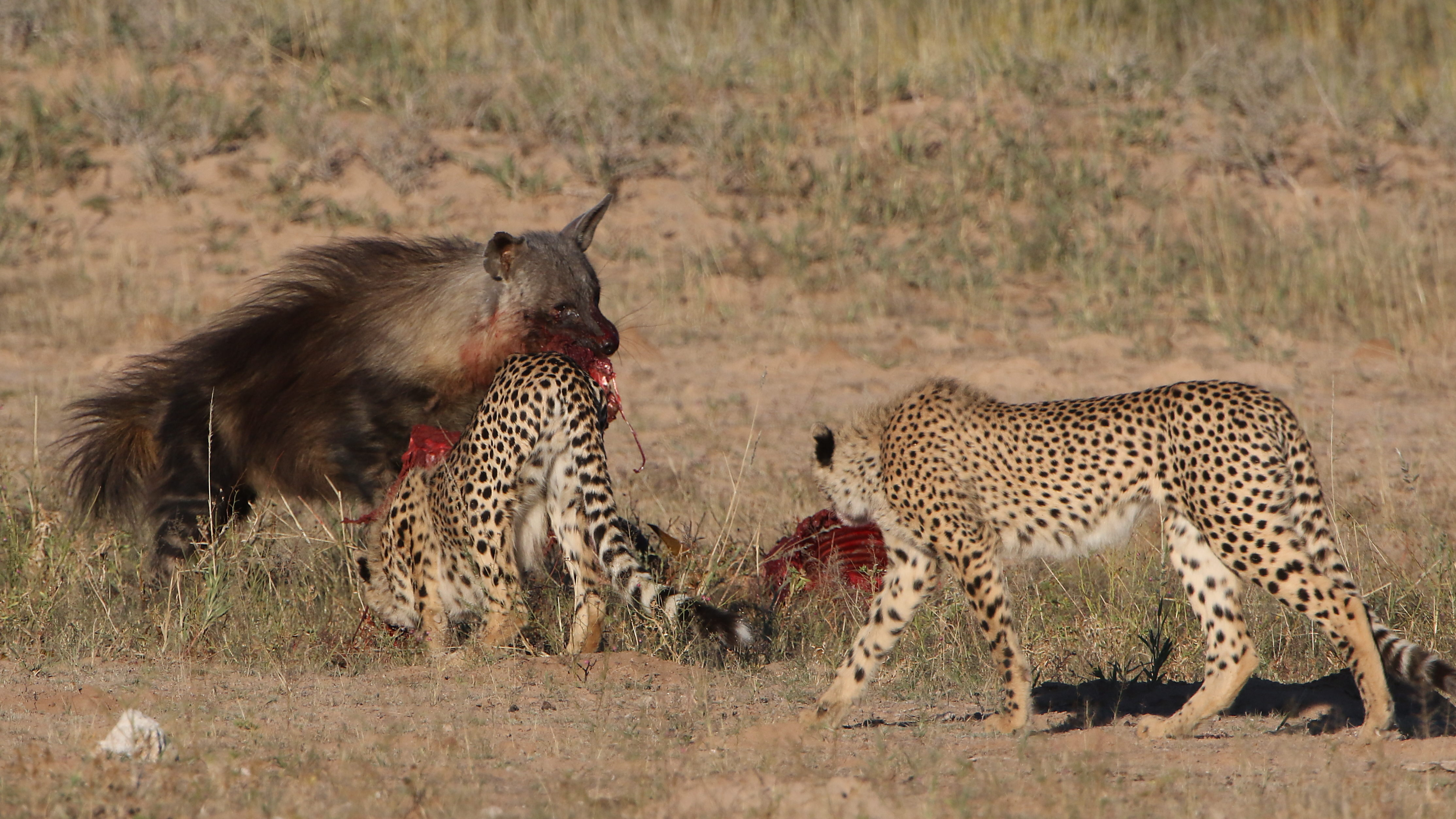
Brown hyena stealing springbok kill from cheetahs to be cached nearby

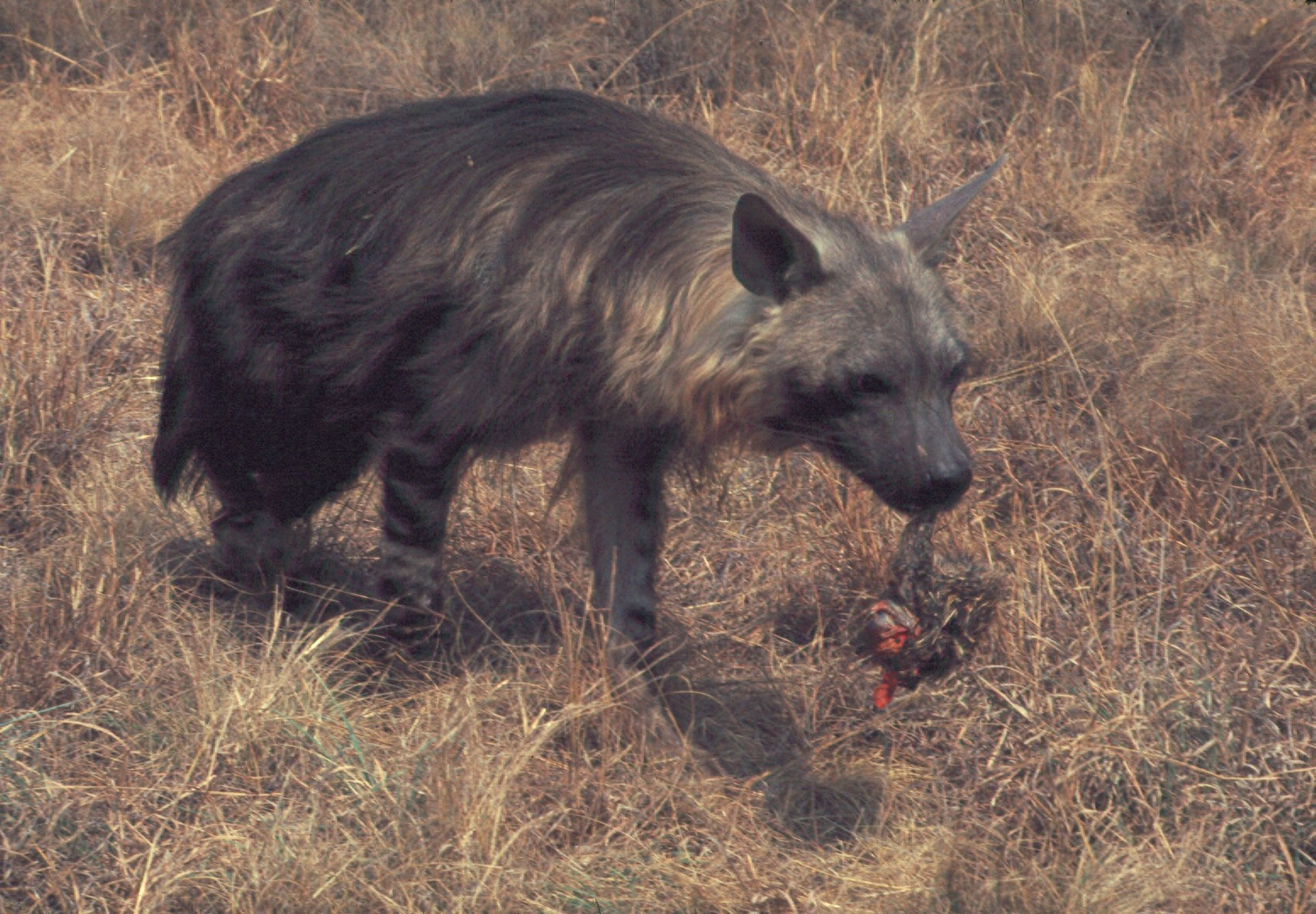
Brown hyena with food in mouth

The brown hyena is primarily a scavenger. The bulk of its diet consists of carcasses killed by larger predators, but it supplements its diet with rodents, small birds, insects, eggs, feces, fruit like tsama melon Citrullus lanatus var. vulgaris, the hookeri melon Cucumis africanus and the gemsbok melon Acanthosicyos naudinianus), and the desert truffle (Kalaharituber pfeilii). Live prey makes up only a small proportion of its diet. In the southern Kalahari Desert, species such as springhare, gemsbok, springbok lambs, Burchell's zebra, bat-eared foxes, korhaans, crowned lapwings and helmeted guinea fowl constitute 4.2% of its diet, while on the Namib coast, black-backed jackals and cape fur seal pups compose 2.9% of the diet. It has an exceptional sense of smell and can locate carcasses kilometers away.

It is an aggressive kleptoparasite, frequently appropriating the kills of black-backed jackals, cheetahs and leopards. Single brown hyenas charge at leopards with their jaws held wide open and can tree adult male leopards. They have been observed treeing leopards even when no kill was in contention. In the Kalahari Desert, they are often the dominant mammalian carnivores present because of this aggressive behavior and the relative scarcity of lions, spotted hyenas, and packs of African wild dogs. In areas where their territories overlap, brown hyenas may, on rare occasions, be killed by spotted hyenas and lions. Brown hyena cubs are also susceptible to being killed by wild dogs and jackals.

=== Reproduction and life cycle ===
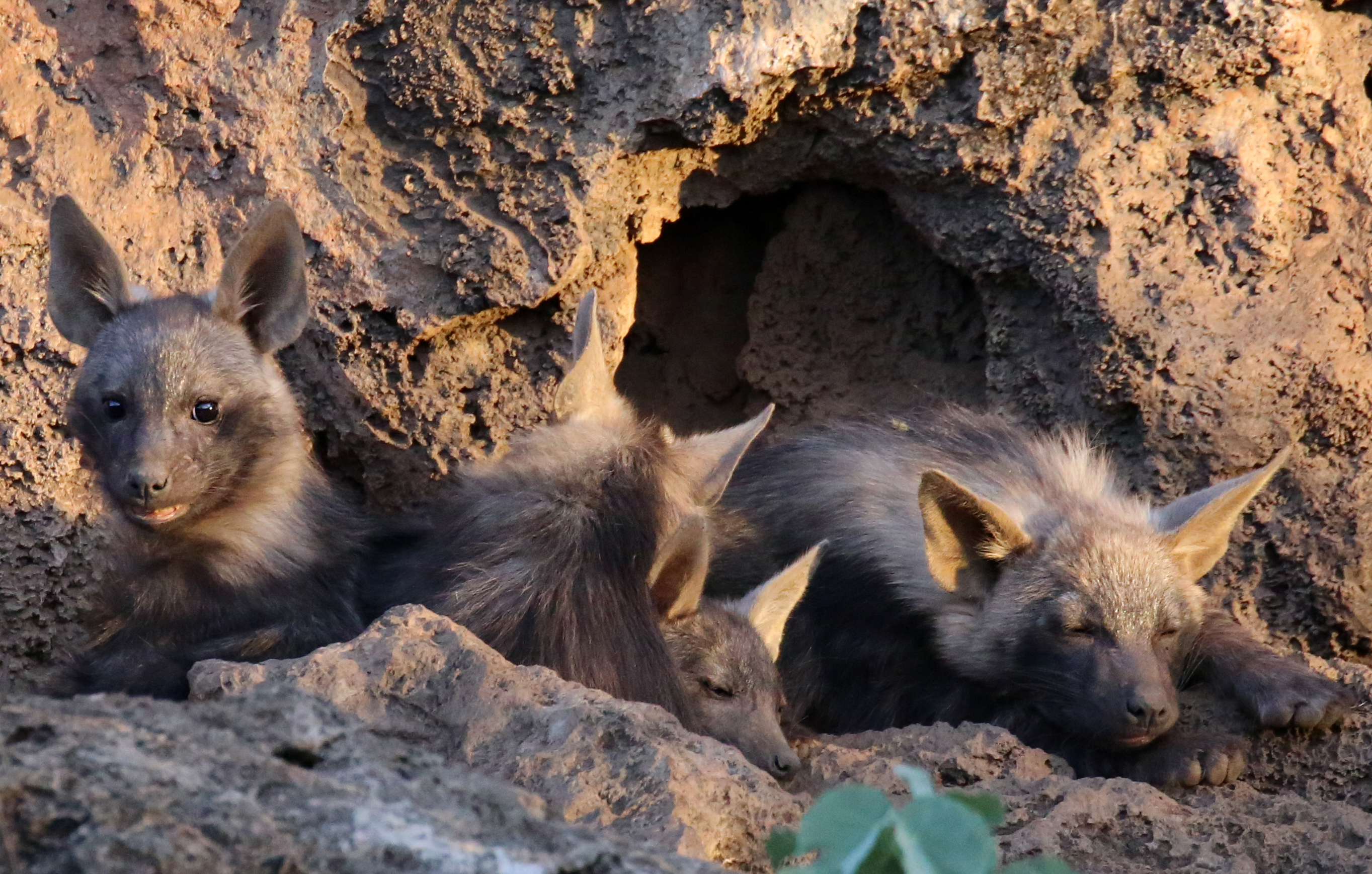
Brown hyena cubs

Female brown hyenas are polyestrous and typically produce their first litter when they are two years old. They mate primarily from May to August. Males and females in the same clan usually do not mate with each other; rather, females will mate with nomadic males. Clan males display no resistance to this behavior and assist the females in raising pups. Females give birth in dens, which are hidden in remote sand dunes far from the territories of spotted hyenas and lions. The gestation period is around three months. Females generally give birth to one litter every 20 months. Usually, only the dominant female breeds; however, if two litters are born in the same clan, the females nurse each other's pups, though favoring their own. Litters usually consist of 1–5 pups, which weigh 1 kg (2.2 lb) at birth. Young are born with their eyes closed and open them after eight days. They are weaned at 12 months and leave their dens after 18 months. All adult members of the clan bring food to the pups. They are not fully weaned and do not leave the vicinity of their den until they reach 14 months of age. They reach full size at an age of around 30 months.

== Threats and conservation status ==
The global brown hyena population is estimated to comprise 4,000 to 10,000 individuals. It is listed as Near Threatened in the IUCN Red List. The major threat to the brown hyena is human persecution, based on the mistaken belief that it is harmful to livestock. Farmers find brown hyenas scavenging on livestock carcasses and wrongly assume that the hyenas have killed their animals. Brown hyena body parts are also occasionally used for traditional medicines and rituals. The brown hyena is not in high demand for trophy hunting.

There are several conservation areas that are home to the brown hyena, including the Etosha National Park in Namibia, the Central Kalahari Game Reserve in Botswana and the Kgalagadi Transfrontier Park. The maintenance of these protected areas aids in the conservation of these animals. Educational campaigns are being utilized to promote awareness about hyenas and dispel prevailing myths, while problem individuals are removed from farmlands and urbanized areas.
