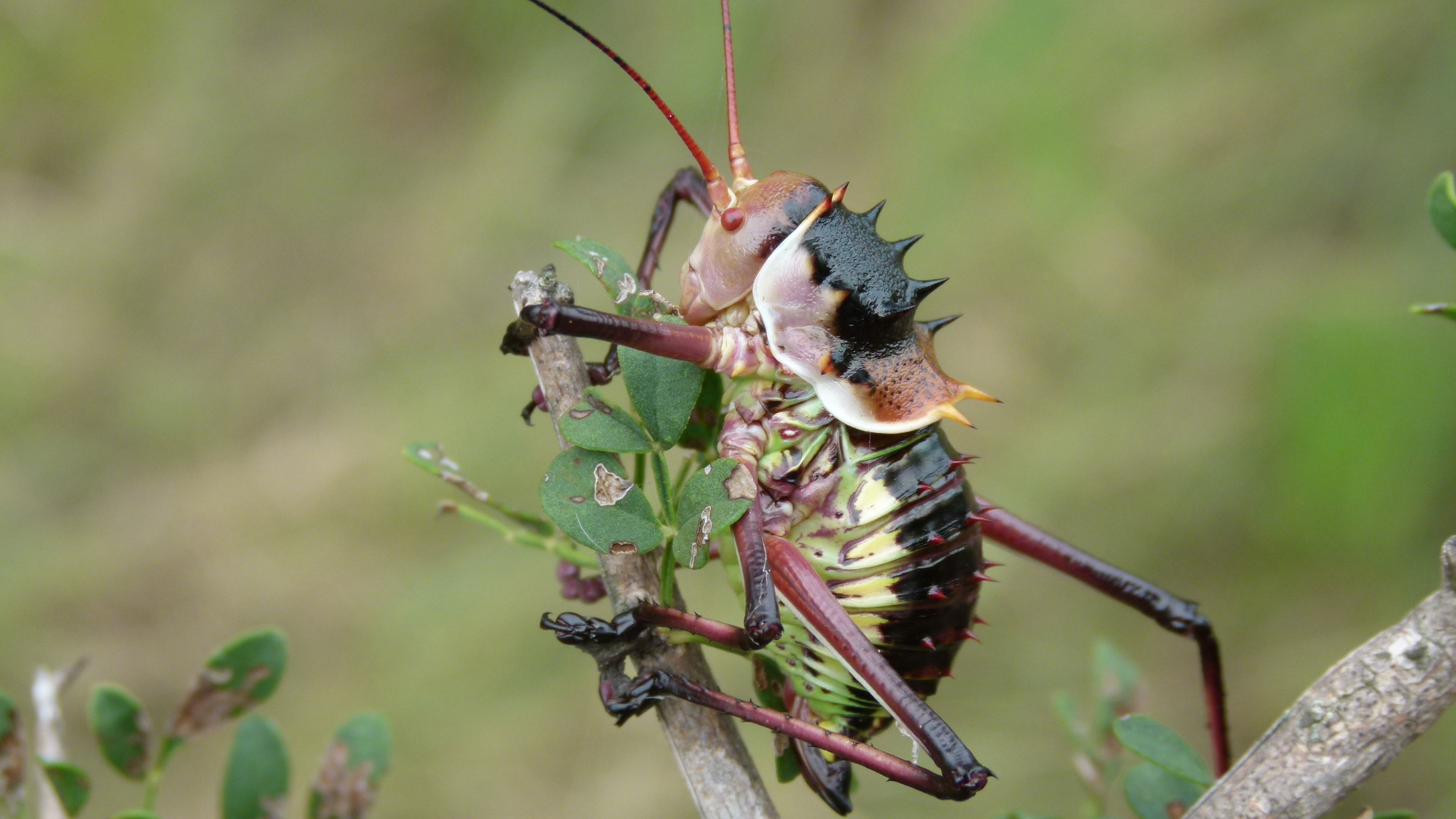
- A. discoidalis in the Kruger; Park, South Africa

Scientific classification
- Kingdom: Animalia
- Phylum: Arthropoda
- Clade: Pancrustacea
- Class: Insecta
- Order: Orthoptera
- Suborder: Ensifera
- Family: Tettigoniidae
- Tribe: Acanthoplini
- Genus: Acanthoplus; Stål, 1873

Species
- See article

= Acanthoplus =

Corn crickets

Genus of cricket-like animals

Acanthoplus is a genus of African bush crickets in the subfamily Hetrodinae and tribe Acanthoplini (but placed previously in the Bradyporinae).

== Species ==
- A. armativentris — corn cricket
- A. bechuanus
- A. cervinus — corn cricket
- A. desertorum
- A. discoidalis — armoured katydid, corn cricket
- A. germanus
- A. innotatus
- A. jallae
- A. loandae
- A. longipes — long-legged armoured katydid
- A. pallidus
- A. serratus
- A. spiseri
- A. stratiotes
- A. varicornis
- A. weidneri
