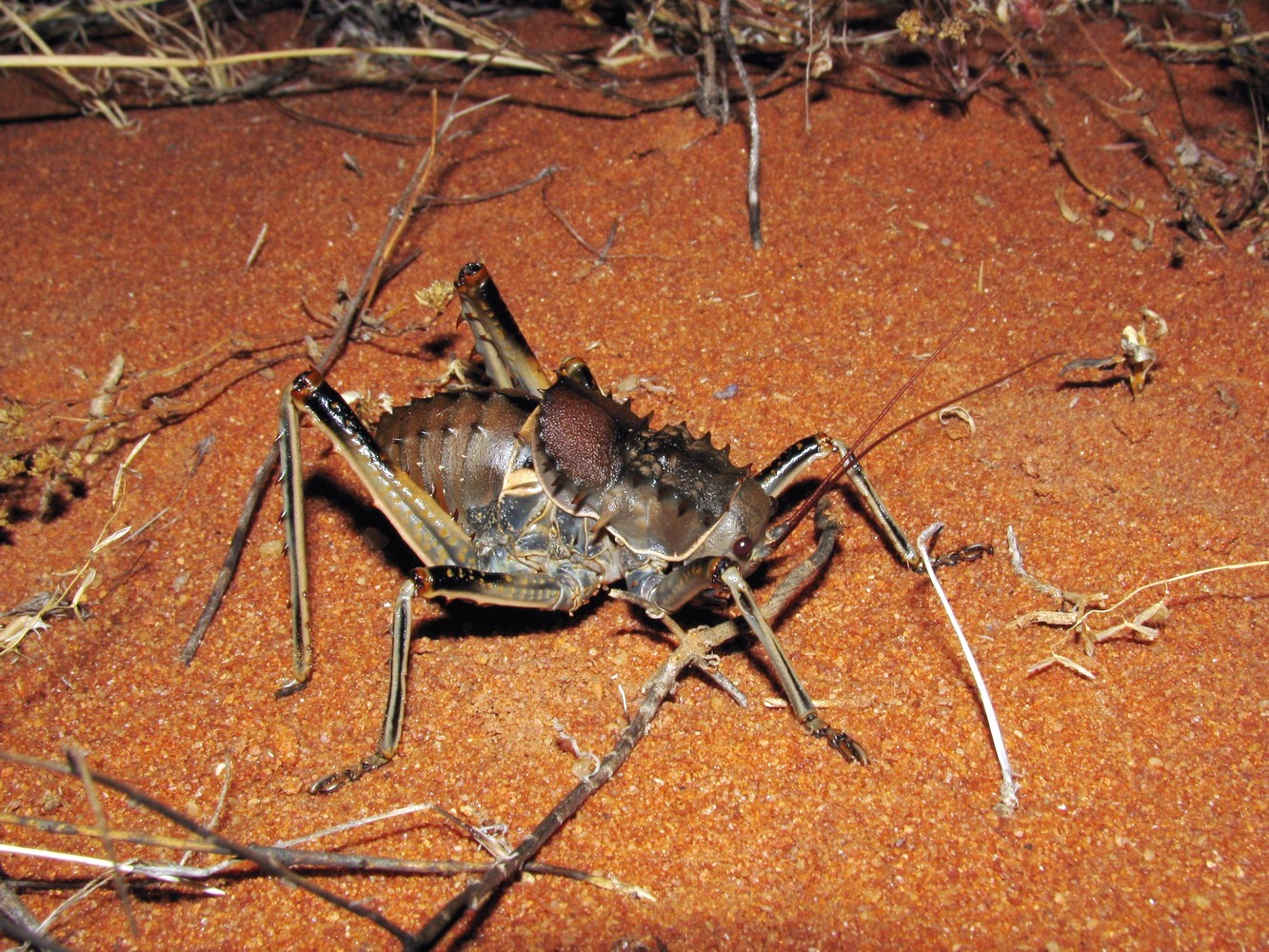
- Hetrodes pupus male
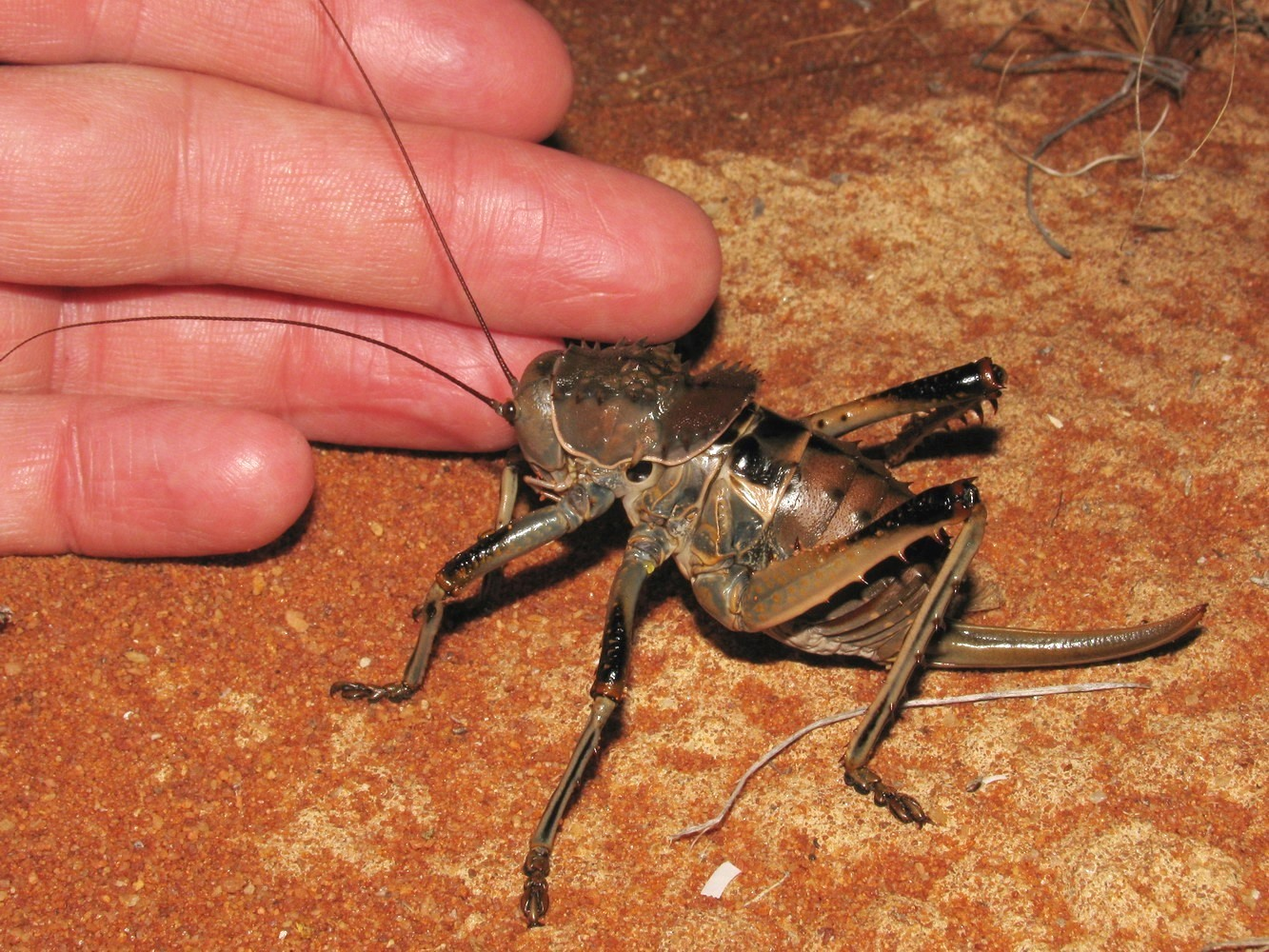
- female

Scientific classification
- Domain: Eukaryota
- Kingdom: Animalia
- Phylum: Arthropoda
- Class: Insecta
- Order: Orthoptera
- Suborder: Ensifera
- Family: Tettigoniidae
- Subfamily: Hetrodinae
- Tribe: Hetrodini; Brunner von Wattenwyl, 1878
- Genus: Hetrodes; Fischer von Waldheim, 1833
- Species: H. pupus

Binomial name
- Hetrodes pupus (Linnaeus, 1758)

= Hetrodes =

Genus of cricket-like animals

Hetrodes is a genus of South African Orthopterans, typical of the subfamily Hetrodinae, erected by Fischer von Waldheim in 1833. It is a monotypic genus and currently the sole representative of the tribe Hetrodini Brunner von Wattenwyl, 1878.

== Species and subspecies ==
The Orthoptera Species File lists the single species Hetrodes pupus (Linnaeus, 1758) and the following subspecies:

1. H. pupus abbreviatus Walker, 1869
2. H. pupus marginatus Walker, 1869
3. H. pupus namaqua Péringuey, 1916
4. H. pupus pupus (Linnaeus, 1758) – type (described as Gryllus pupus Linnaeus)

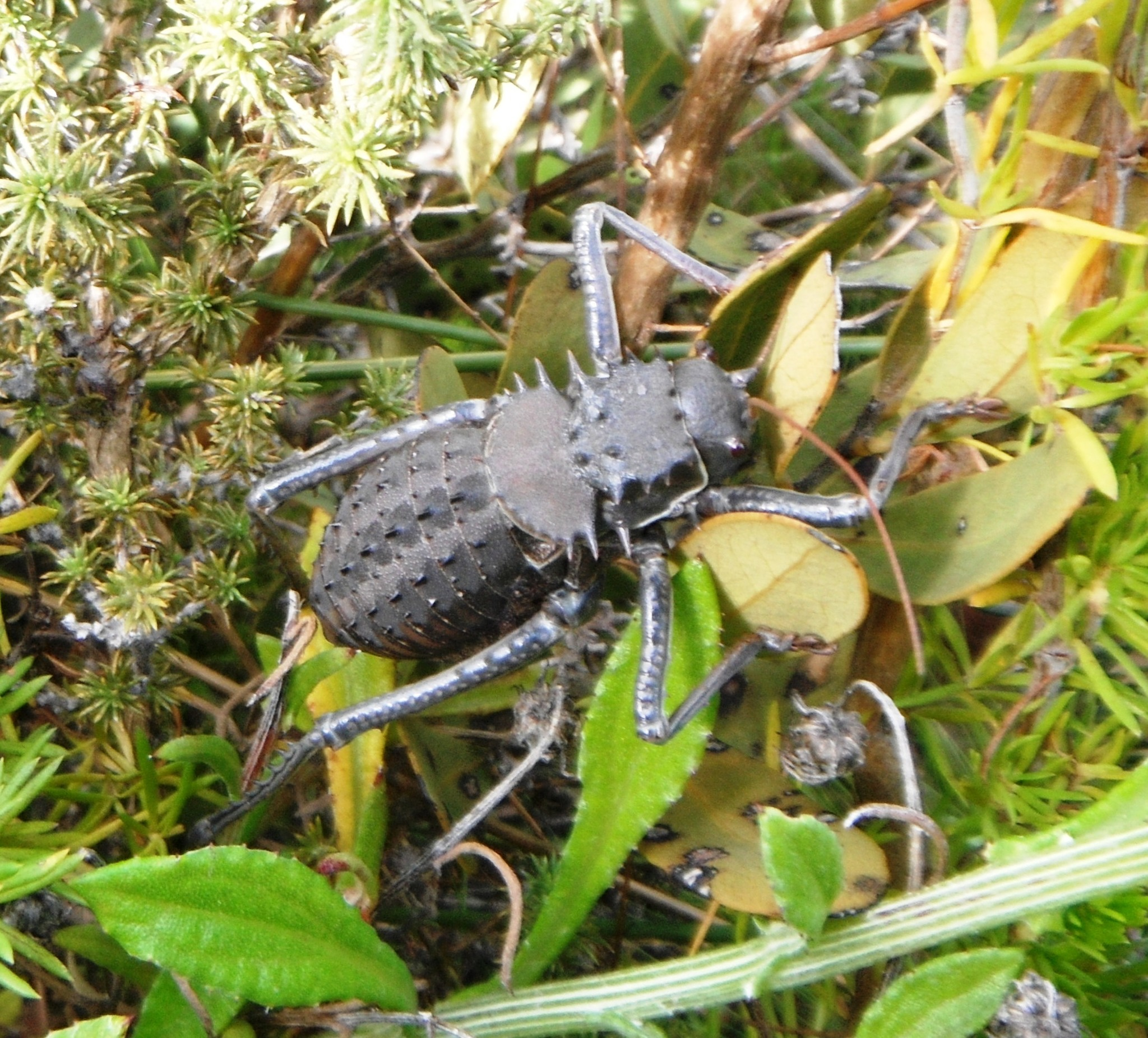
H. pupus pupus
