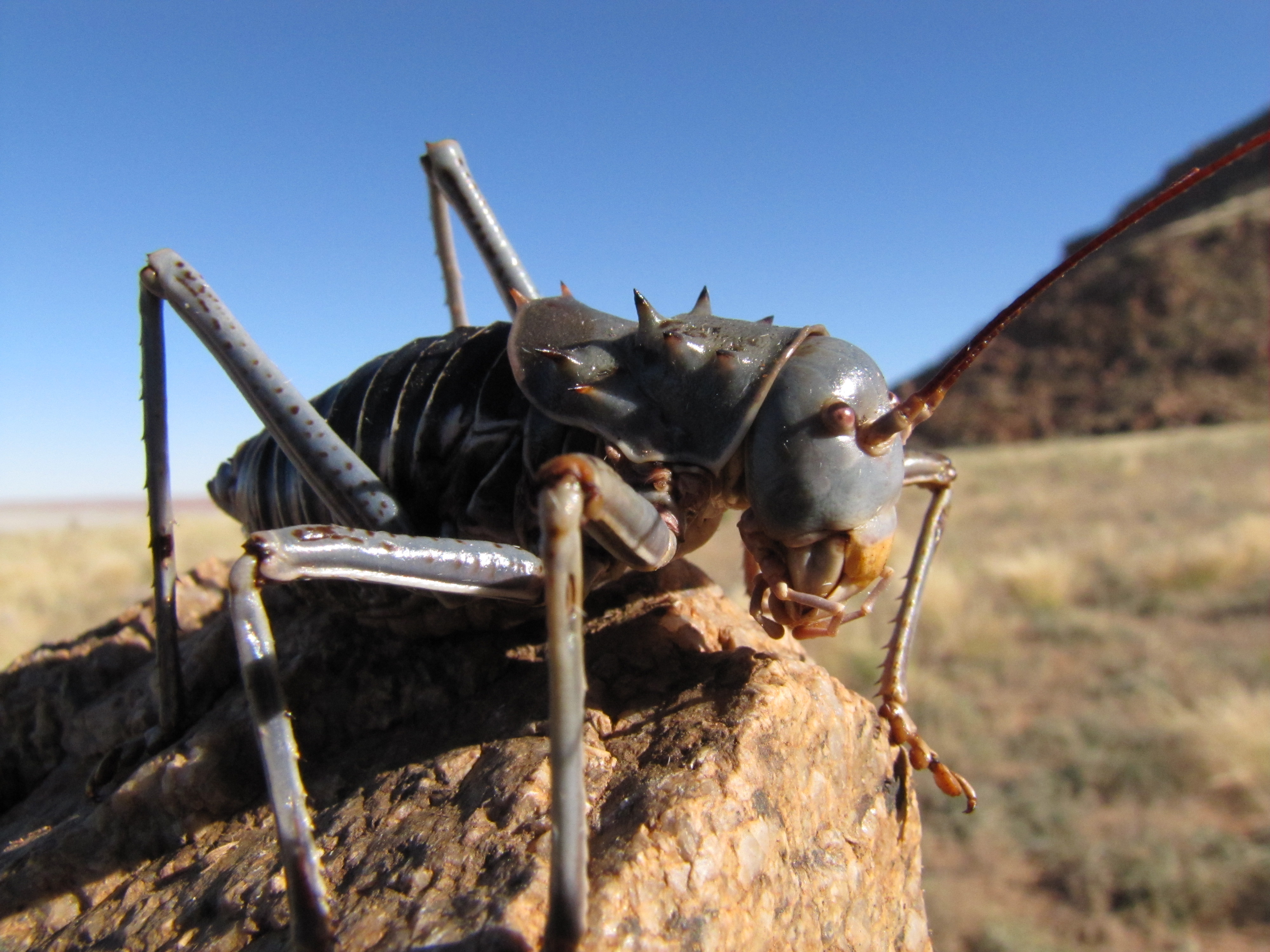

Conservation status
- Least Concern (IUCN 3.1)

Scientific classification
- Kingdom: Animalia
- Phylum: Arthropoda
- Clade: Pancrustacea
- Class: Insecta
- Order: Orthoptera
- Suborder: Ensifera
- Family: Tettigoniidae
- Genus: Acanthoplus
- Species: A. discoidalis

Binomial name
- Acanthoplus discoidalis (Walker, 1869)

Synonyms
- Hetrodes discoidalis Walker, 1869

= Acanthoplus discoidalis =

Koringkriek

Species of cricket-like animal

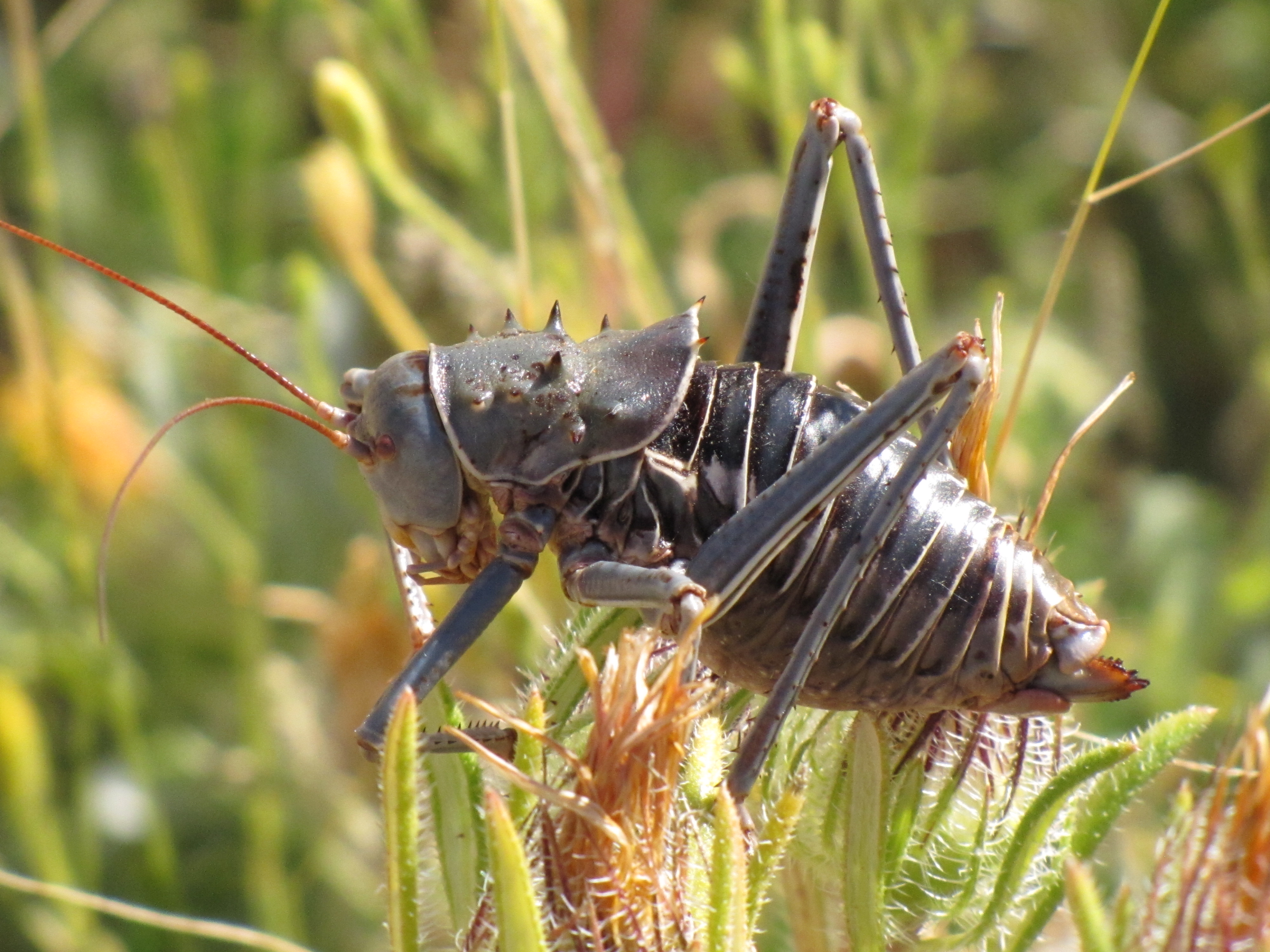
Acanthoplus discoidalis

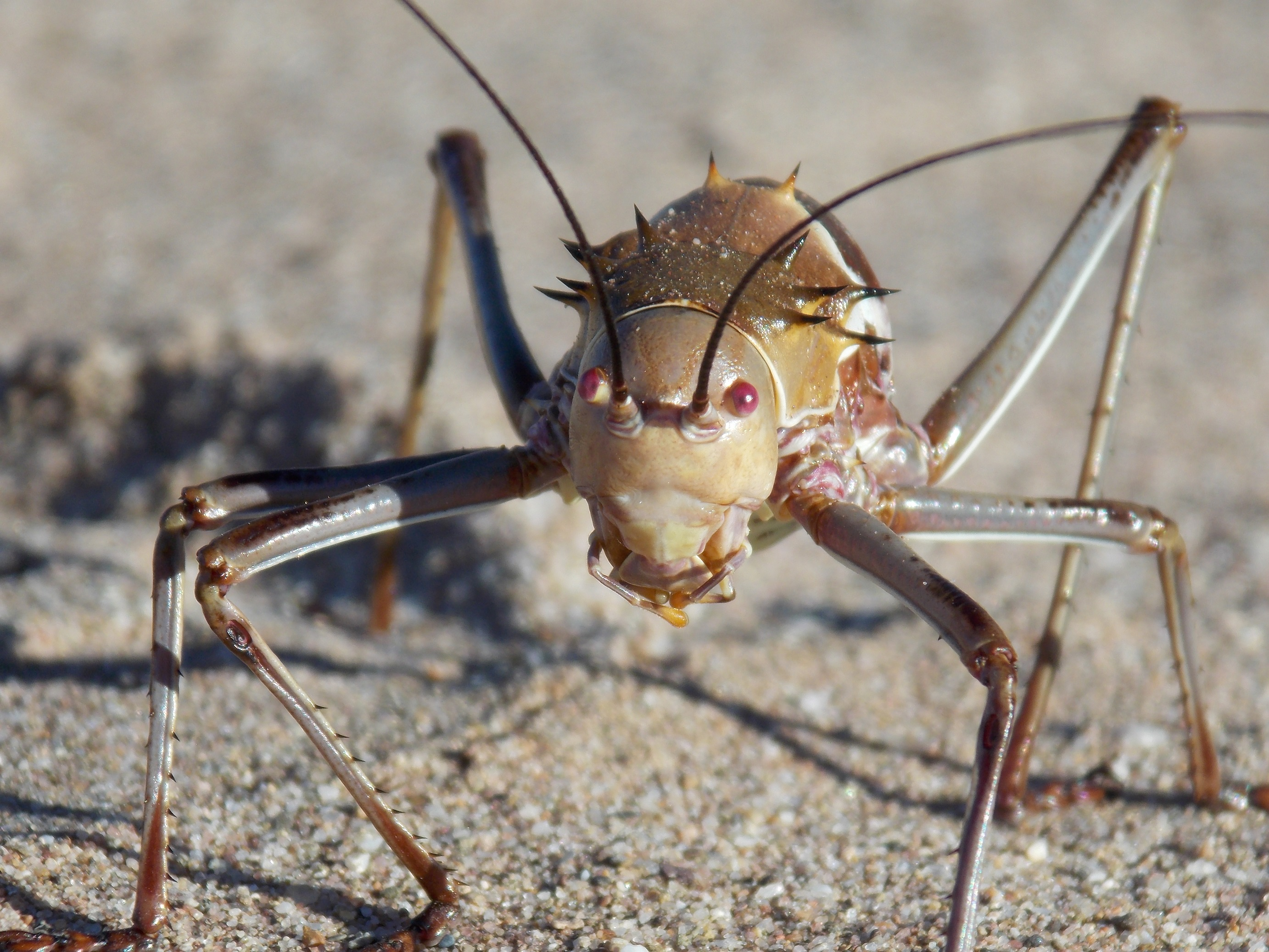
Koringkriek in Fish River Canyon

Acanthoplus discoidalis is a species in the Hetrodinae, a subfamily of the bush cricket or katydid family. Like its closest relatives, Acanthoplus discoidalis variously bears common names such as armoured katydid, armoured ground cricket, armoured bush cricket, corn cricket, setotojane and koringkriek. The species is native to parts of Angola, Namibia, Botswana, Zimbabwe and South Africa.

== Description ==
Acanthoplus discoidalis is a wide-bodied, flightless species that typically grows to a body length of about 5 cm/1.95 inches. The pronotum bears several sharp, conical spines. The mandibles, or main biting jaws, are powerful; they can inflict a painful nip and they permit the insect to feed on material such as tough herbage or carrion. Another defense against predators is reflex bleeding (also called "autohaemorrhaging") in which the insects squirt haemolymph from pores in their exoskeleton, achieving a range of a few centimetres.

== Diet ==
Acanthoplus discoidalis is omnivorous and feeds opportunistically on many different foods. One source documented attacks on red-billed quelea nestlings and suggested that the insects might be able to detect the nests by auditory clues.

Especially when their diet is deficient in protein and salt, members of the species commonly become cannibalistic, so much so that when their populations peak in autumn and some of them stray across roads and are crushed by traffic, cannibalistic conspecifics congregate around the casualties and feed until they are killed in turn. During that season their remains may form large patches on roads.

== Defense ==
Acanthoplus discoidalis has several defensive mechanisms apart from the armoured exoskeleton. Their defence takes various forms, depending on the gender of the individual and the method of attack.

When attacked from the side, both males and females will attempt to bite the attacker and males will stridulate (females have no functional stridulatory mechanism). In about half the attacks from the side, either gender may autohaemorrhage, squirting between 5 mg and 80 mg of possibly toxic haemolymph at the attacker at ranges of up to 3 cm.

When attacked from above, and therefore not in a good position to bite the attacker, either gender will autohaemorrhage more than when attacked from the side.

Experiments have shown that the haemolymph is distasteful to at least two reptile species, but the repellent components have not been determined. It has been hypothesised that they may be phytotoxins found in plants that the insects eat and that they then sequester those substances to use as defensive compounds themselves.

After autohaemorrhaging the insects clean themselves meticulously. This is thought to reduce the probability that other members of the species will attack them cannibalistically. Research on the species suggests that autohaemorrhage is a precisely regulated defence response rather than an accidental consequence of being attacked. Another defensive response is to regurgitate their stomach contents when attacked, which happens most often when the insect has already been attacked repeatedly.

== Reproduction ==
In Acanthoplus discoidalis, courtship and mating is a relatively slow process; it starts at sunset and usually is completed by sunrise. First the stridulation of the males attracts females. The male produces a large spermatophore that includes a sperm pouch and an attached spermatophylax, a portion of food that serves as a nuptial gift to the female. Having mated, a male cannot mate again before he has had time to grow a new spermatophore.

A female must mate before laying her first clutch of eggs. Thereafter she may mate and lay eggs again in any arbitrary order, as she can store sperm. Accordingly, it is advantageous for males to mate with virgins, as a higher proportion of the offspring of a virgin female will be their own. Virgins are lighter than non-virgins, which offers males a basis for distinguishing them when copulating. Males accordingly complete more matings with virgins than non-virgins and they transfer their spermatophore more quickly.

== Control ==
Acanthoplus discoidalis is a pest of sorghum and millet in Southern Africa. In bad years, they may cause crop losses of up to 40%. Insecticides can control infestations, but as Acanthoplus discoidalis are flightless they can be controlled fairly easily by constructing a 50 cm deep trench around the field. If it seems worthwhile, poisoned baits in the trenches can increase the intensity of control. It has been suggested that the insects could be collected and used as a high protein chicken feed.
