= Striped thorny katydid =

Conservation status
- Least Concern (IUCN 3.1)

Scientific classification
- Kingdom: Animalia
- Phylum: Arthropoda
- Class: Insecta
- Order: Orthoptera
- Suborder: Ensifera
- Family: Tettigoniidae
- Genus: Acanthoproctus
- Species: A. vittatus

Binomial name
- Acanthoproctus vittatus (Walker, 1869)

Synonyms
- Heterodes vittatus Walker, 1869

Species of cricket-like animal

The striped thorny katydid (Acanthoproctus vittatus) is a species of katydid that is found in South Africa, predominantly in the Karoo biome.
