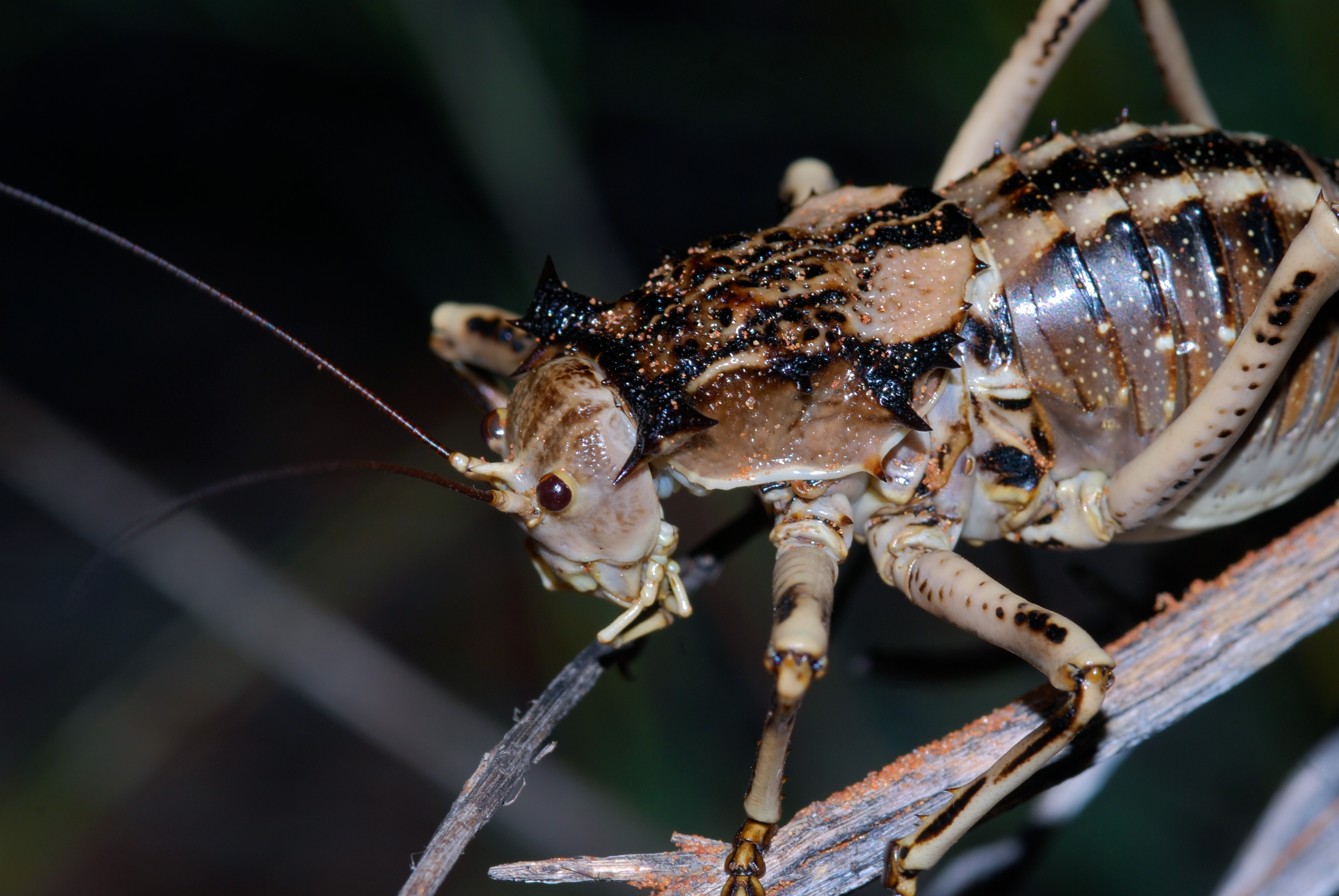
- Acanthoproctus cervinus - Twee Rivieren Camp, Kgalagadi Transfrontier Park, South Africa

Scientific classification
- Domain: Eukaryota
- Kingdom: Animalia
- Phylum: Arthropoda
- Class: Insecta
- Order: Orthoptera
- Suborder: Ensifera
- Family: Tettigoniidae
- Subfamily: Hetrodinae
- Tribe: Eugastrini
- Genus: Acanthoproctus

Species
- See article

= Acanthoproctus =

Genus of cricket-like animals

Acanthoproctus is a genus of African bush crickets in the subfamily Hetrodinae and tribe Eugastrini.

== Species ==
- Acanthoproctus cervinus — Antlered thorny katydid
- Acanthoproctus diadematus — Namibia katydid
- Acanthoproctus vittatus — Striped thorny katydid
