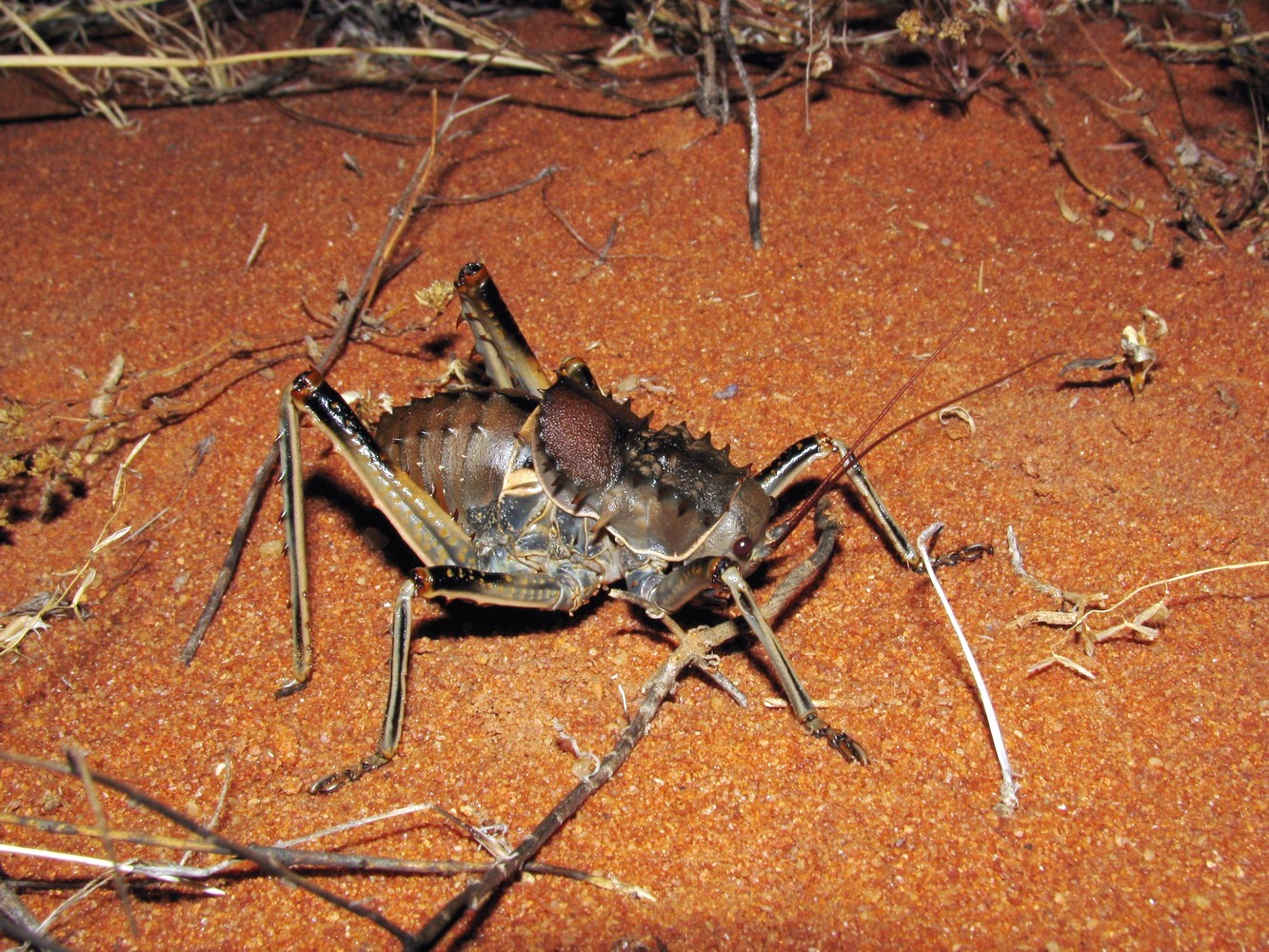
- Hetrodes pupus

Scientific classification
- Domain: Eukaryota
- Kingdom: Animalia
- Phylum: Arthropoda
- Class: Insecta
- Order: Orthoptera
- Suborder: Ensifera
- Family: Tettigoniidae
- Subfamily: Hetrodinae; Brunner von Wattenwyl, 1878

Synonyms
- Heterodidae Brunner von Wattenwyl, 1878; Hetrodidae Brunner von Wattenwyl, 1878

= Hetrodinae =

Subfamily of cricket-like animals

The Hetrodinae are a subfamily of robust bush crickets, also known as armoured katydids, corn crickets, etc. (Orthoptera: Ensifera) currently including five tribes.

== Distribution ==
The subfamily is endemic to Africa and adjacent areas of the Arabian Peninsula.

== Tribes and genera ==
The subfamily consists of the following tribes and genera:

=== Acanthoplini ===
Authority: Ebner 1964

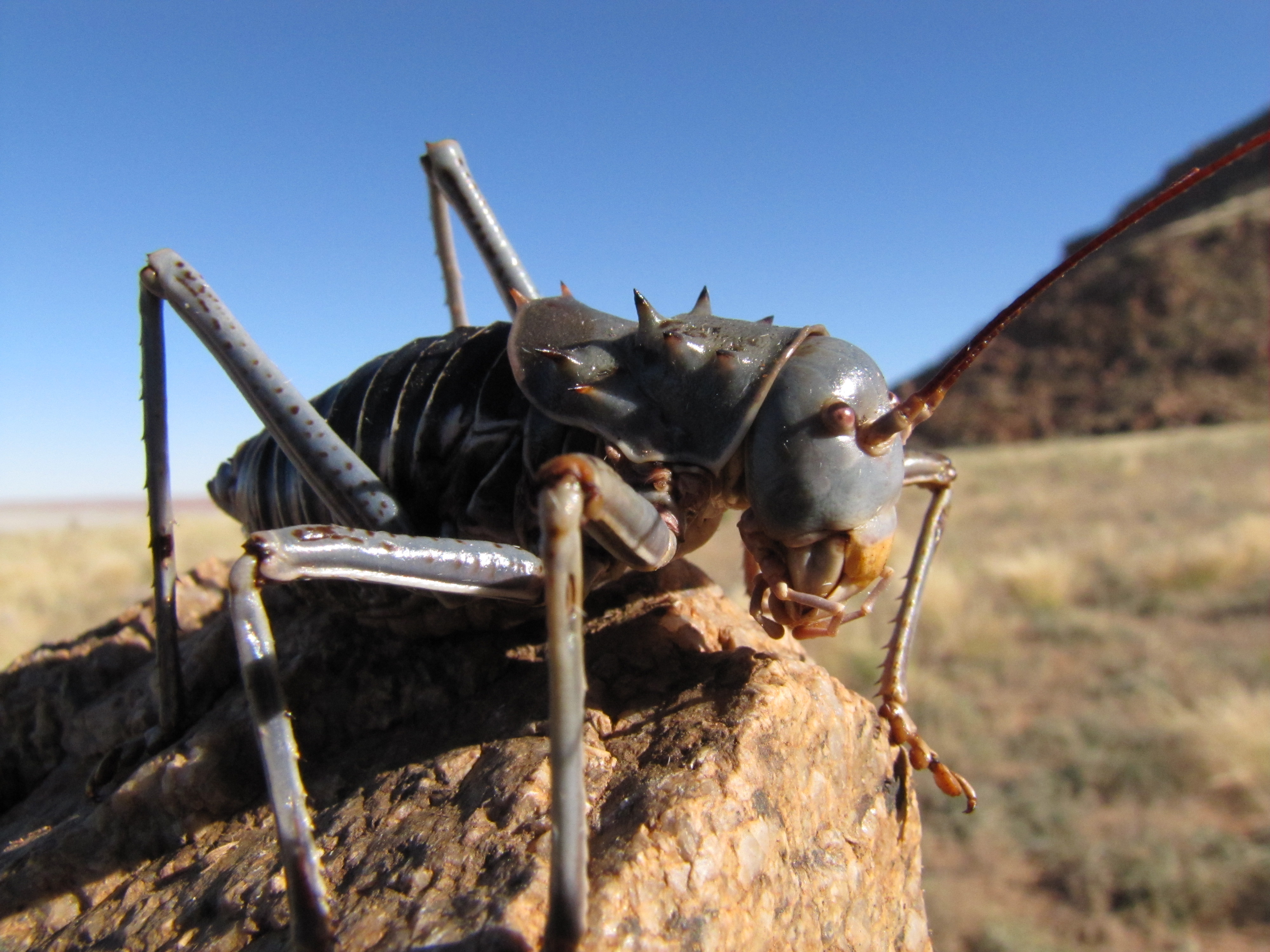
Acanthoplus discoidalis in the Namib Desert

1. Acanthoplus Stål, 1873
2. Cloanthella Bolívar, 1890

=== Anepisceptini ===
Authority: Schmidt, G.H. 1998

1. Anepisceptus Fieber, 1853
2. Weidnerius Schmidt, 1998

=== Enyaliopsini ===
Authority: Weidner 1955

1. Cosmoderus Lucas, 1868
2. Enyaliopsis Karsch, 1887
3. Gymnoproctus Karsch, 1887
4. Hemihetrodes Pictet, 1888

=== Eugastrini ===
Authority: Karsch 1887

1. Acanthoproctus Karsch, 1887
2. Bradyopisthius Karsch, 1887
3. Eugaster Serville, 1838
4. Eugasteroides Weidner, 1955
5. Spalacomimus Karsch, 1887

=== Hetrodini ===
Authority: Brunner von Wattenwyl 1878

- Hetrodes Fischer von Waldheim, 1833
