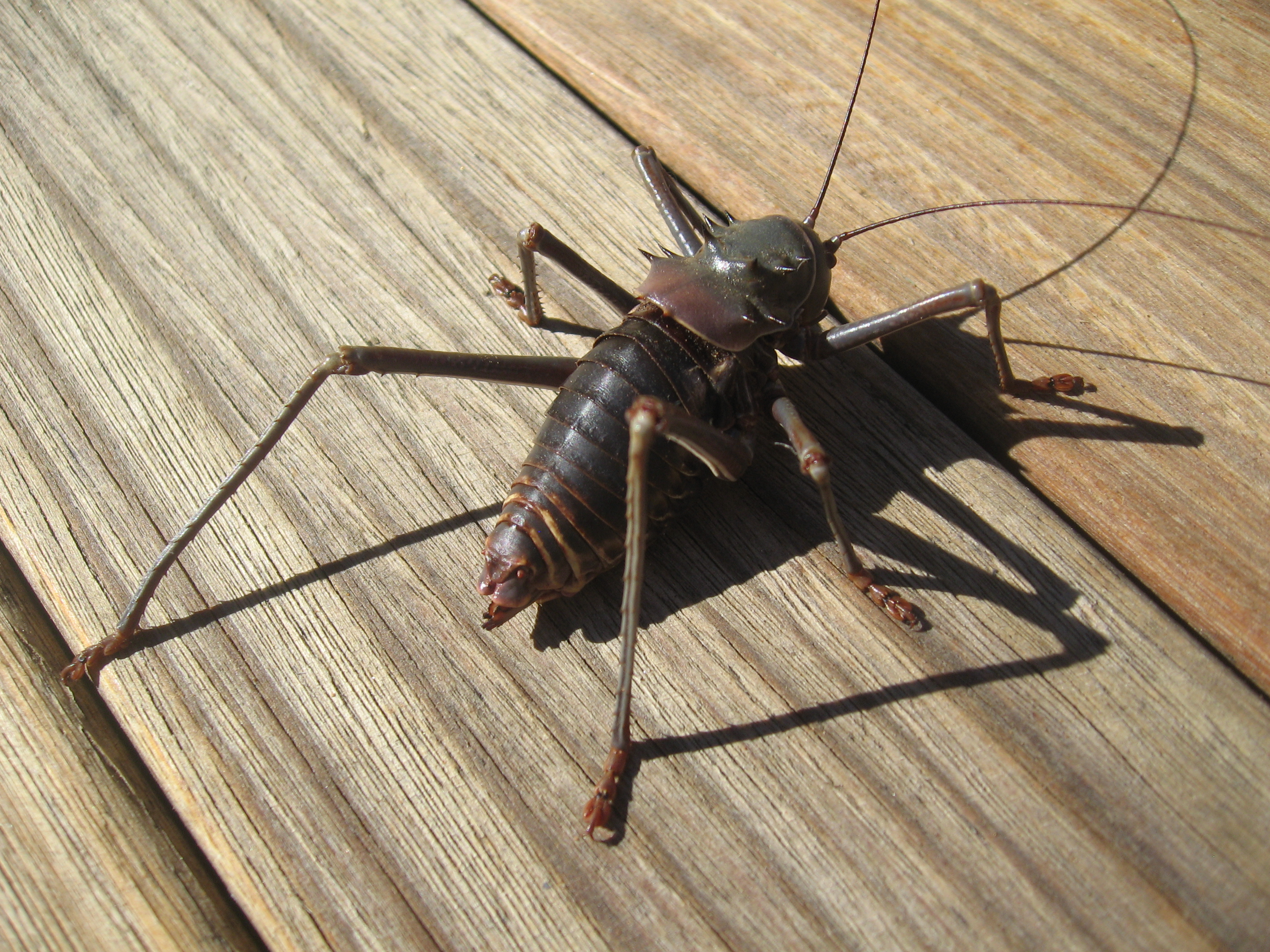

Conservation status
- Least Concern (IUCN 3.1)

Scientific classification
- Domain: Eukaryota
- Kingdom: Animalia
- Phylum: Arthropoda
- Class: Insecta
- Order: Orthoptera
- Suborder: Ensifera
- Family: Tettigoniidae
- Genus: Acanthoplus
- Species: A. longipes

Binomial name
- Acanthoplus longipes (Charpentier, 1845)

Synonyms
- Hetrodes longipes Charpentier, 1845

= Acanthoplus longipes =

Long-legged armoured katydid

Species of cricket-like animal

The long-legged armoured katydid (Acanthoplus longipes) is a species of katydid found in Namibia, and also in the northern portion of Northern Cape Province, South Africa, and southern Angola. It may possibly occur in Botswana. It is found in semi-arid and arid habitats, including the Kalahari Desert and the Namib Desert. It is threatened by habitat destruction, but is widespread and is not considered to be endangered.

It has been recorded feeding on teff in Africa.

Long-legged armored katydids utilize the auditory system to communicate with one another through infraspecific auditory communication. Acanthoplus longipes' song calling usually consists of verses with two pulses. The first pulse contains three pulses and the second pulse contains five pulses and they generally lasts for a few minutes.
