= Parahyaena howelli =

Parahyaena howelli Temporal range: Early Pliocene

Scientific classification
- Kingdom: Animalia
- Phylum: Chordata
- Class: Mammalia
- Order: Carnivora
- Family: Hyaenidae
- Genus: Parahyaena
- Species: P. howelli

Binomial name
- Parahyaena howelli Werdelin, 2003

Extinct species of hyena

Parahyaena howelli is an extinct species of hyaenid in the genus Parahyaena that lived in Africa during the Zanclean stage of the Pliocene epoch.

== Palaeobiology ==
=== Palaeoecology ===
Parahyaena howelli, like modern carnivorous hyaenids, is believed to have cached carcasses in association with its denning behaviour, and it is believed to be responsible for the accumulations of Australopithecus anamensis fossils at the Early Pliocene site of Kanapoi in Kenya.
