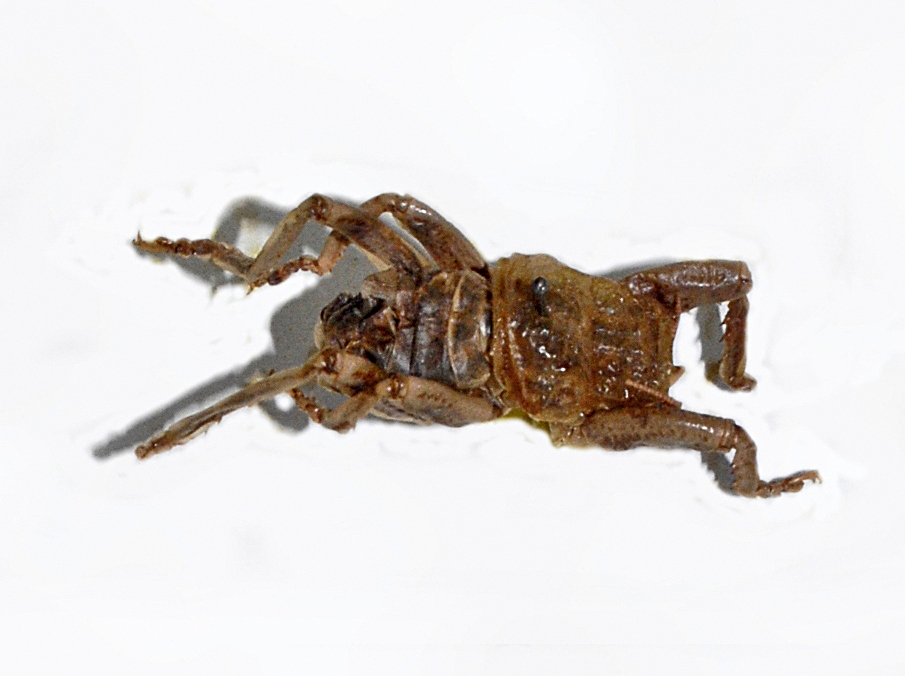
- Spalacomimus talpa

Scientific classification
- Domain: Eukaryota
- Kingdom: Animalia
- Phylum: Arthropoda
- Class: Insecta
- Order: Orthoptera
- Suborder: Ensifera
- Family: Tettigoniidae
- Subfamily: Hetrodinae
- Tribe: Eugastrini
- Genus: Spalacomimus; Karsch, 1887

= Spalacomimus =

Genus of cricket-like animals

Spalacomimus is a genus of African bush crickets in the subfamily Hetrodinae and tribe Eugastrini.

== Species ==
- Spalacomimus aberrans (Schulthess, 1898)
- Spalacomimus inermis (Uvarov, 1934)
- Spalacomimus liberiana (La Baume, 1911)
- Spalacomimus magnus (La Baume, 1911)
- Spalacomimus stettinensis (Weidner, 1941)
- Spalacomimus talpa (Gerstaecker, 1869)
- Spalacomimus verruciferus (Karsch, 1887)
