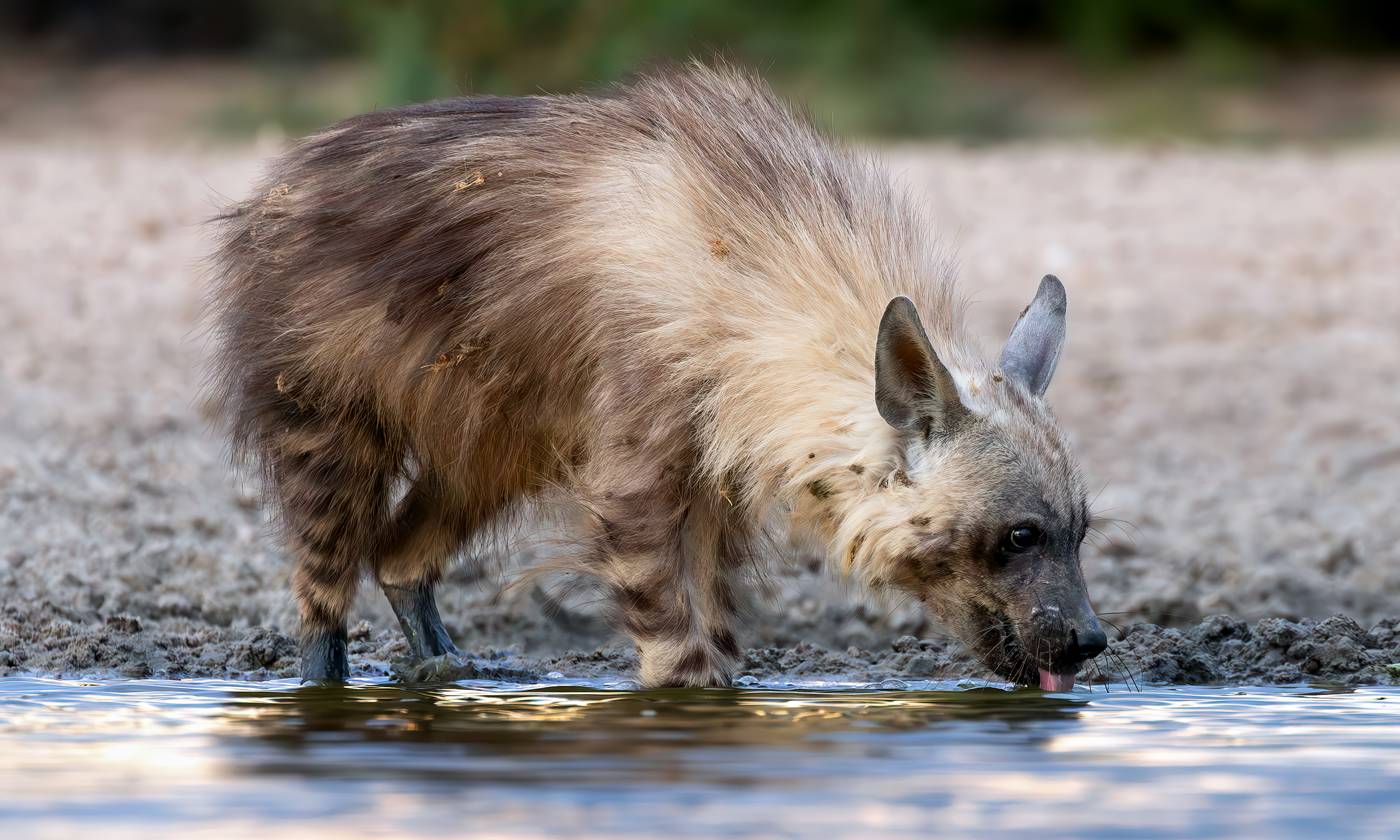
- Brown hyena (Parahyaena brunnea)

Scientific classification
- Kingdom: Animalia
- Phylum: Chordata
- Class: Mammalia
- Order: Carnivora
- Family: Hyaenidae
- Subfamily: Hyaeninae
- Genus: Parahyaena; Hendey, 1974

Type species
- Hyaena brunnea Thunberg, 1820

Species
- Parahyaena brunnea Thunberg, 1820; †Parahyaena howelli Werdelin, 2003

= Parahyaena =

Parahyaena Temporal range: 4.0–0 Ma Pliocene - Present

Genus of mammals

Parahyaena is a genus of hyenas that contains the extant brown hyena (Parahyaena brunnea). Parahyaena howelli, an early member of this genus, has been dated to approximately 4 million years ago.

== Taxonomy ==
Pérez-Claros (2024) argued that Parahyaena and Pachycrocuta were synonymous, and that Pliocrocuta perrieri and "Hyaena" prisca should be included under Pachycrocuta. A later study by Martínez-Navarro et al. (2025) regarded Parahyaena and Pliocrocuta as distinct from Pachycrocuta.

== Conservation status ==
With an estimated population of 8,000 individuals, the brown hyena is considered near threatened on the IUCN red list. The brown hyena is mainly threatened by the increase of agriculture in non-protective areas throughout Sub-Saharan Africa.
