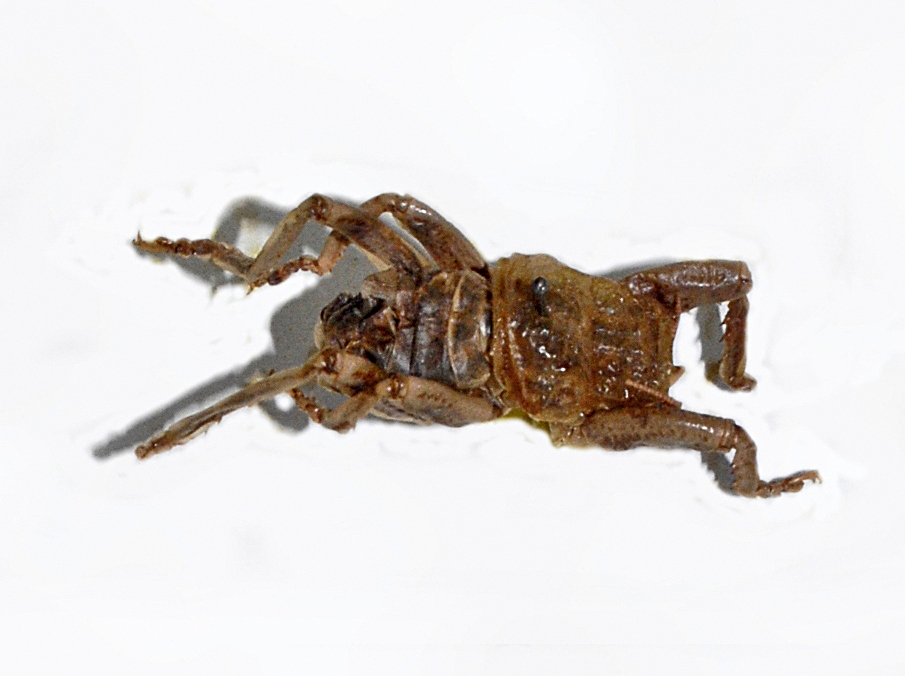
- Spalacomimus talpa. Museum specimen

Scientific classification
- Kingdom: Animalia
- Phylum: Arthropoda
- Clade: Pancrustacea
- Class: Insecta
- Order: Orthoptera
- Suborder: Ensifera
- Family: Tettigoniidae
- Genus: Spalacomimus
- Species: S. talpa

Binomial name
- Spalacomimus talpa (Gerstaecker, 1869)

= Spalacomimus talpa =

Species of cricket-like animal

Spalacomimus talpa is a species of katydids.

== Distribution ==
This species is present in East Tropical Africa, Tanzania, Arusha or Zanzibar.
