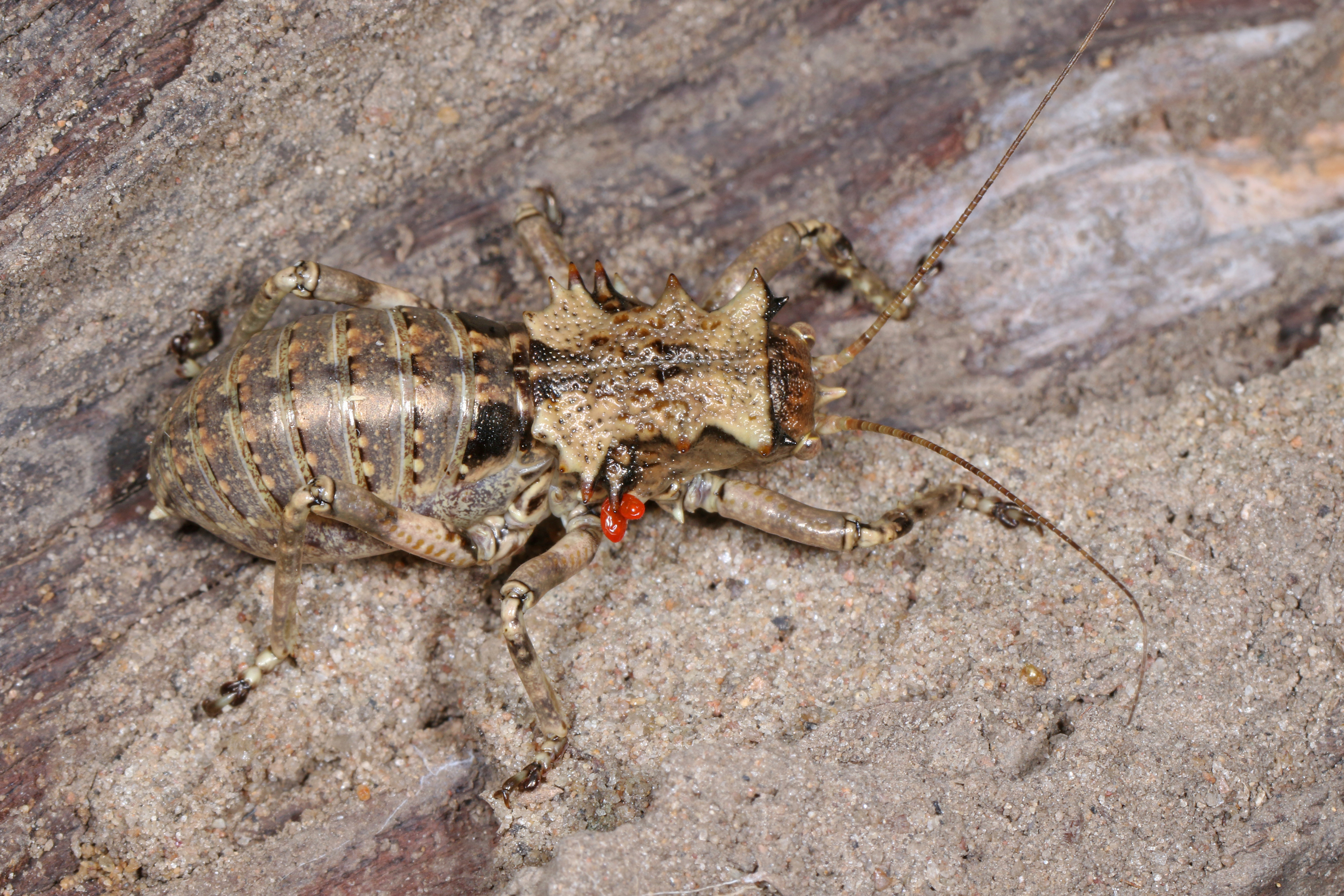
- Enyaliopsis petersii, Gorongosa National Park, Mozambique

Scientific classification
- Domain: Eukaryota
- Kingdom: Animalia
- Phylum: Arthropoda
- Class: Insecta
- Order: Orthoptera
- Suborder: Ensifera
- Family: Tettigoniidae
- Subfamily: Hetrodinae
- Tribe: Enyaliopsini
- Genus: Enyaliopsis; Karsch, 1887

= Enyaliopsis =

Genus of cricket-like animals

Enyaliopsis is the largest genus in the subfamily Hetrodinae and typical of the tribe Enyaliopsini (family Tettigoniidae: the bush-crickets or katydids). It is made up of 24 species found from east-central to southern Africa.

- Enyaliopsis binduranus Peringuey, 1916
- Enyaliopsis bloyeti (Lucas, 1885)
- Enyaliopsis carolinus Sjostedt, 1913
- Enyaliopsis durandi (Lucas, 1884)
- Enyaliopsis ephippiatus (Gerst., 1869)
- Enyaliopsis guilelmi Sjostedt, 1926
- Enyaliopsis ilala Glenn, 1991
- Enyaliopsis inflatus Weidner, 1941
- Enyaliopsis jennae Glenn, 1991
- Enyaliopsis maculipes Sjostedt, 1926
- Enyaliopsis matabelensis Sjostedt, 1913
- Enyaliopsis monsteri Glenn, 1991
- Enyaliopsis mulanje Glenn, 1991
- Enyaliopsis nyala Glenn, 1991
- Enyaliopsis nyasa Glenn, 1991
- Enyaliopsis nyika Glenn, 1991
- Enyaliopsis obuncus (I. Bolivar, 1881)
- Enyaliopsis parduspes Glenn, 1991
- Enyaliopsis patruelis Peringuey, 1916
- Enyaliopsis petersii (Shaum, 1853)
- Enyaliopsis robustus Weidner, 1955
- Enyaliopsis selindae Glenn, 1991
- Enyaliopsis transvaalensis Peringuey, 1916
- Enyaliopsis viphya Glenn, 1991
