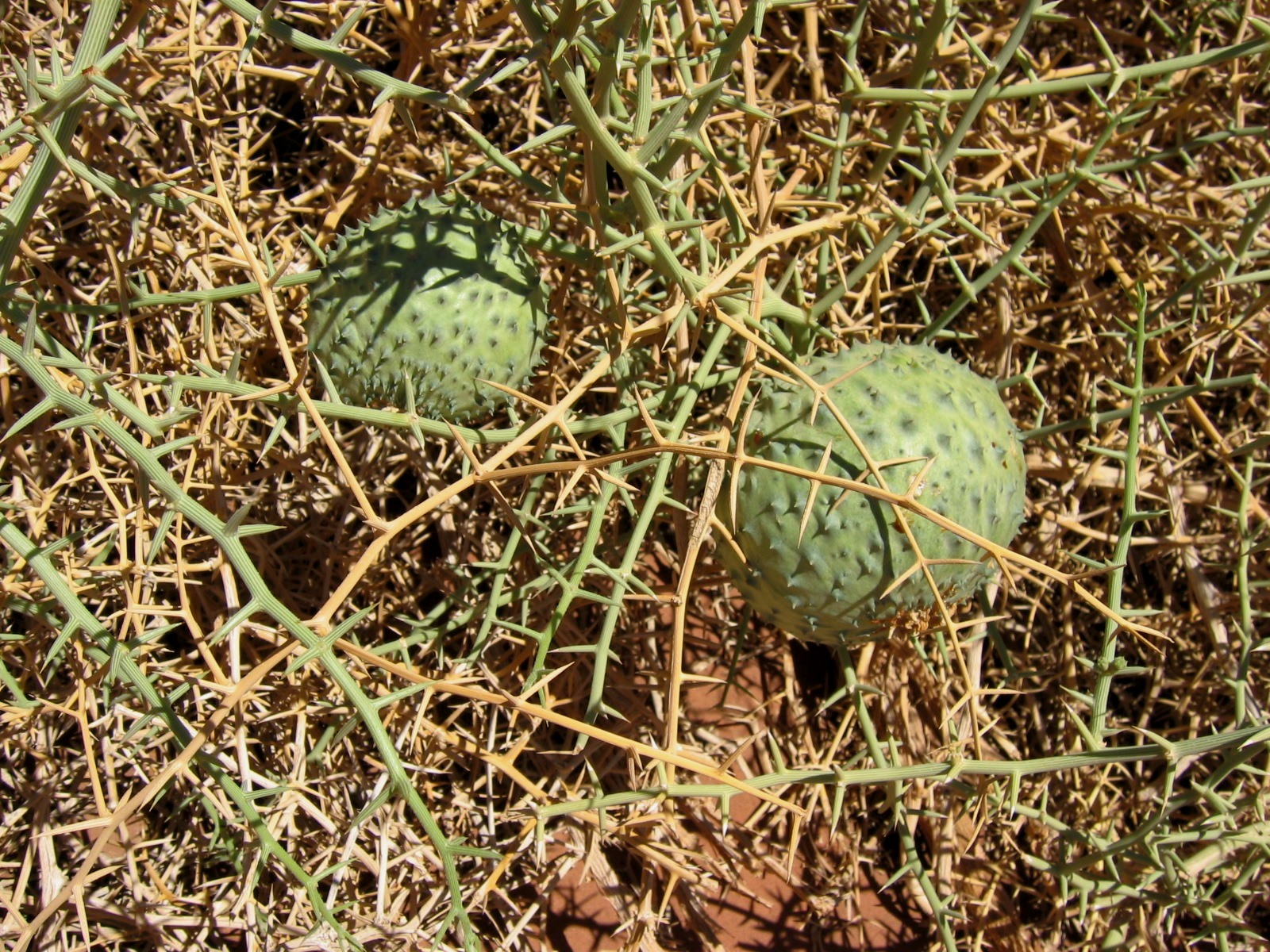

Scientific classification
- Kingdom: Plantae
- Clade: Tracheophytes
- Clade: Angiosperms
- Clade: Eudicots
- Clade: Rosids
- Order: Cucurbitales
- Family: Cucurbitaceae
- Genus: Acanthosicyos
- Species: A. horridus

Binomial name
- Acanthosicyos horridus Welw. ex Benth. & Hook.f.

= Acanthosicyos horridus =

Species of melon

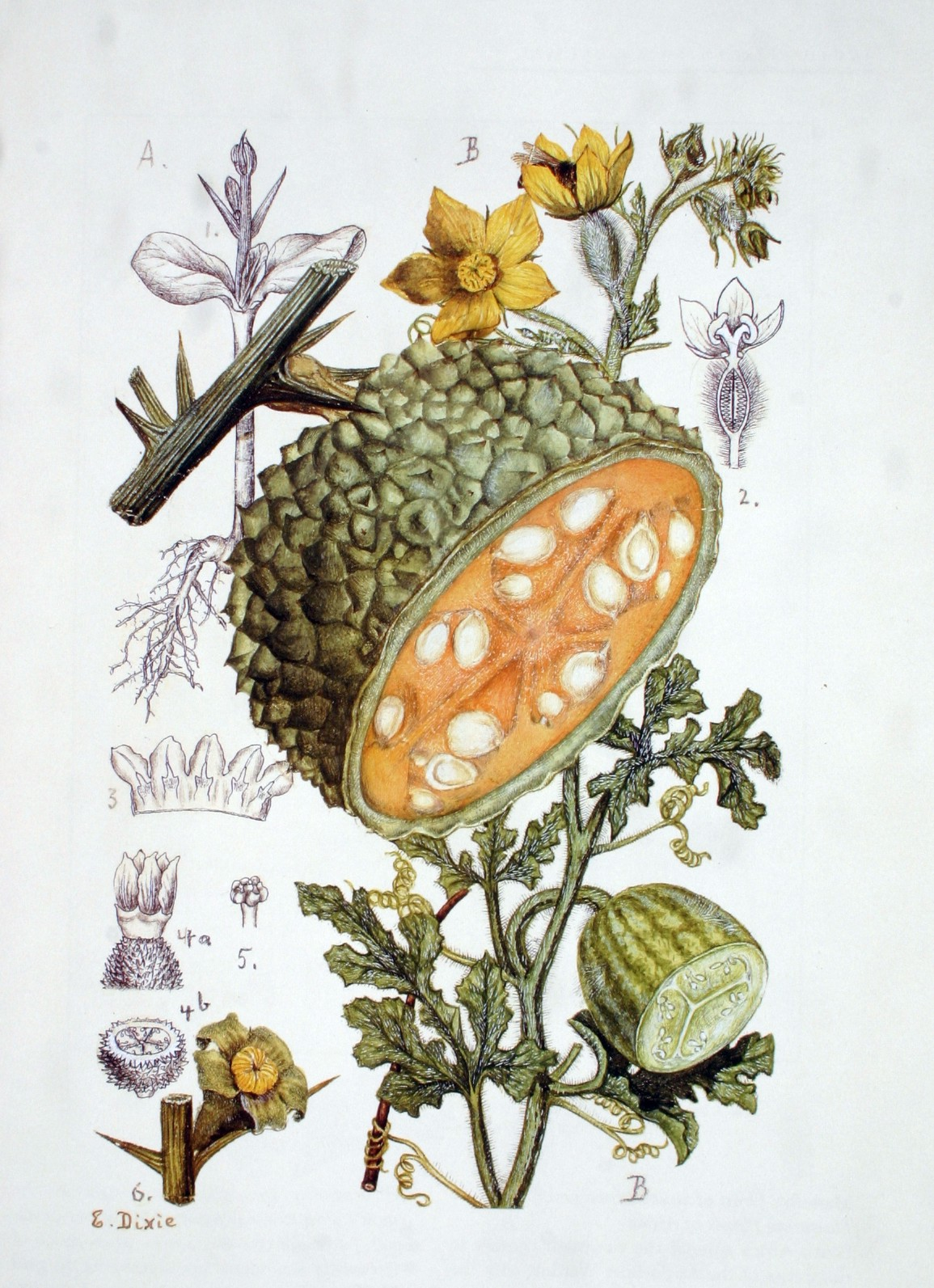
Acanthosicyos horridus (A) Citrullus lanatus (B) by Ethel Dixie c.1925

Acanthosicyos horridus is an unusual melon that is endemic to the Namib desert. In English it is known as Nara, butter-nuts, or butterpips; in one of the Khoisan languages it is locally called ǃnaras or ǃnara ("!" is pronounced with a click, somewhat like the "tsk" when English people are tutting, tsk-tsk).

== Description ==
It is a dioecious, leafless, phreatophyte (meaning its roots penetrate deep down to water near the water table) that is found in sandy deserts but not stony plains, in areas with access to ground water such as ephemeral rivers and paleochannels, where sand accumulating in the shelter of its stems can form hummocks up to 1000–1500 m^{2} in area and 4 meters in height. Its stems may rise more than a meter above the hummocks, while its system of thick taproots can extend up to 50 m downward. The plant is leafless, so modified stems and spines 2–3 centimetres long serve as the photosynthetic "organs" of the plant. The plant can survive many years without water.

== Ecology ==
Its sand-binding characteristics also help nara form microclimates within the desert dunes. These microclimates provide food and shelter for a variety of vertebrates. Presence of the nara plant is associated with significantly increased soil microdiversity likely due to the shade it provides and the attraction of foraging mammals which contribute to organic matter.

Acanthosicyos horridus typically occurs in the absence of other vegetation due to the harshness of the climate, though Eragrostis spinosa and Stipagrostis sabulicola grasses may grow between its hummocks. It is regarded as a keystone species because its melons, seeds, shoots, and flowers are food sources for beetles, gemsbok, and ostrich, while small rodents such as Rhabdomys pumilio, Desmodillus auricularis, and Thallomys nigricauda take shelter amid the spiny tangle of its stems. The katydid Acanthoproctus diadematus feeds on the plant, moving between different bushes at night.

Black-backed jackals sniff out its ripe melon fruits using their jaws to bite through their tough skins. "The chewing molars of canids make them ideal agents for endozoochorous dispersal of large seeds." Such dispersal is long-distance (7–15.9 km). The jackals urinate on buried fruits and later return to them; it is suggested either to mark ownership or mask their smell from rival jackals. Seeds from their droppings germinate better than those extracted directly from ripe fruit. Further, seeds from their scats may then be collected by scatter-hoarding gerbils which move them into microhabitats further dispersing them and optimising their germination. While other carnivores eat other fruits, this seems to be the first case where they might be a plant's primary dispersers.

== Uses ==
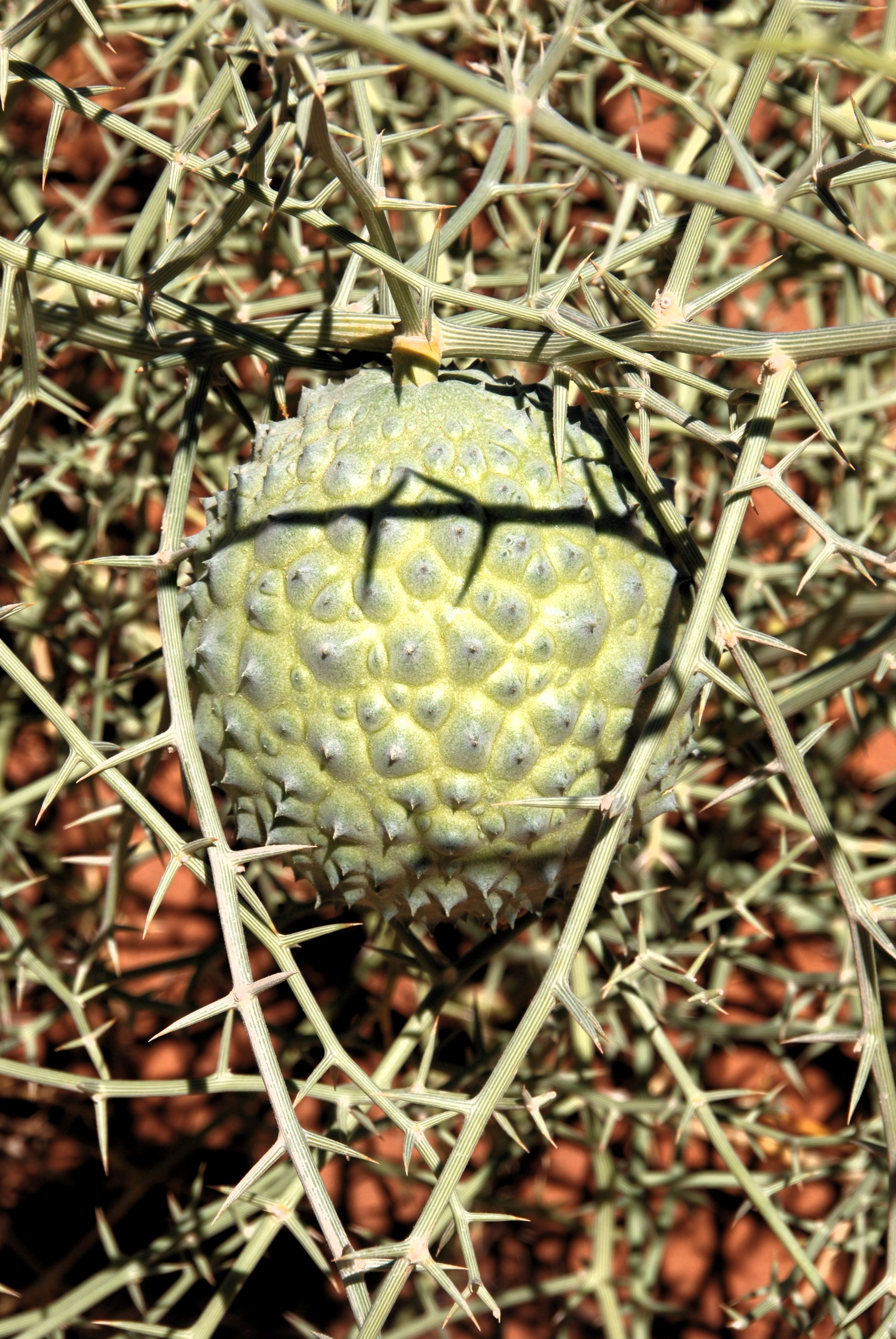
Acanthosicyos horridus fruit in Sossusvlei in Namibia

The melon fruits average 1 kg and are pale green and spiny. Within it has a sweet, aromatic, watery, yellow-orange pulp. The large edible seeds, white to cream in color, are known as butter-nuts or butterpips. These have been exported for use in baked goods.

The fruit serves as a food source for Nama people from February to April and August to September.

== See also ==
- Nabkha
- Hummock
