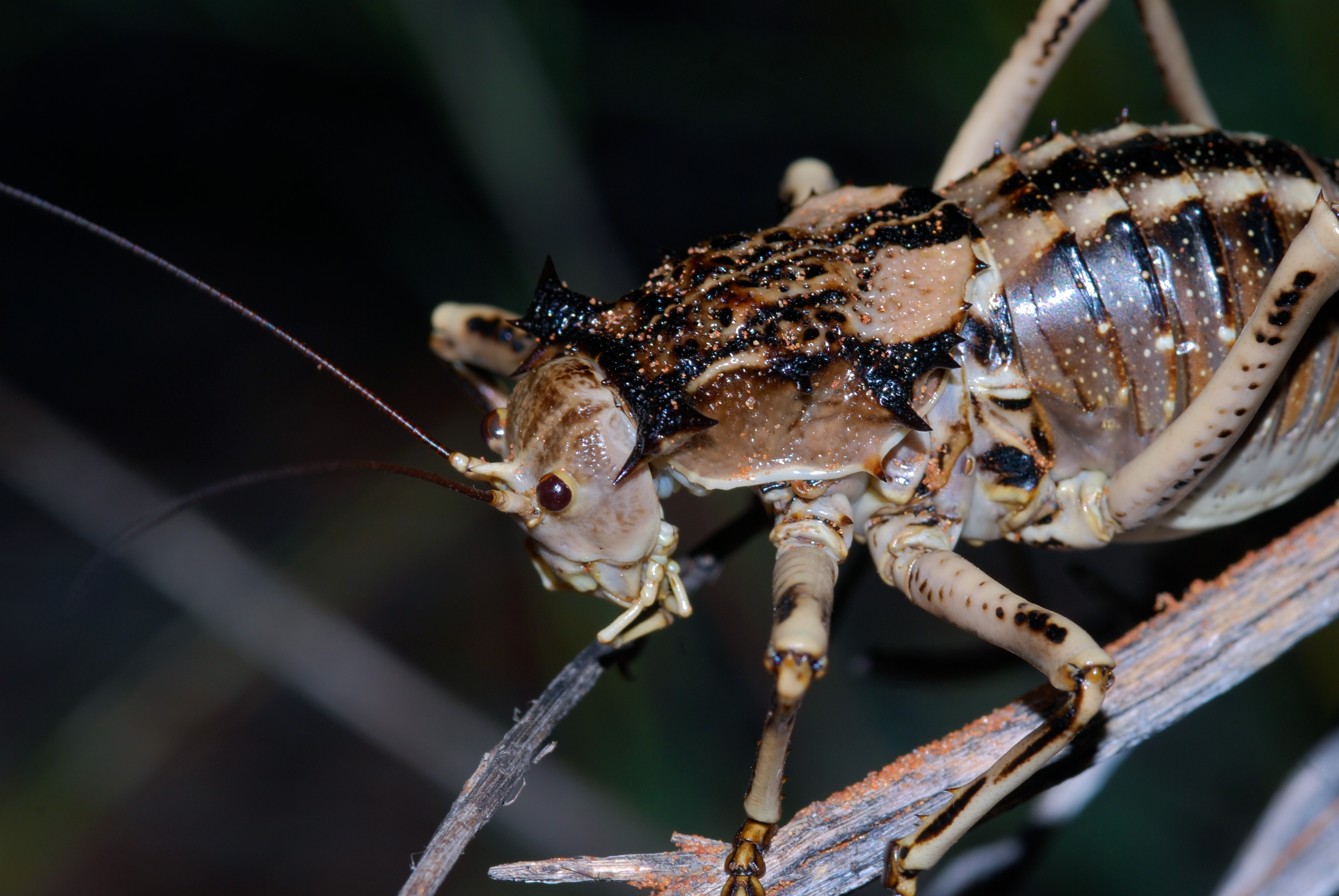

Conservation status
- Least Concern (IUCN 3.1)

Scientific classification
- Domain: Eukaryota
- Kingdom: Animalia
- Phylum: Arthropoda
- Class: Insecta
- Order: Orthoptera
- Suborder: Ensifera
- Family: Tettigoniidae
- Genus: Acanthoproctus
- Species: A. cervinus

Binomial name
- Acanthoproctus cervinus (Haan, 1842)

Synonyms
- Locusta cervinus Haan, 1842

= Antlered thorny katydid =

Species of cricket-like animal

The antlered thorny katydid (Acanthoproctus cervinus) is a species of katydid that is found in South Africa and Namibia. It can be found in semi-arid and arid habitats, including the Kalahari Desert, the Namib Desert, and in the Karoo and Fynbos biomes.
