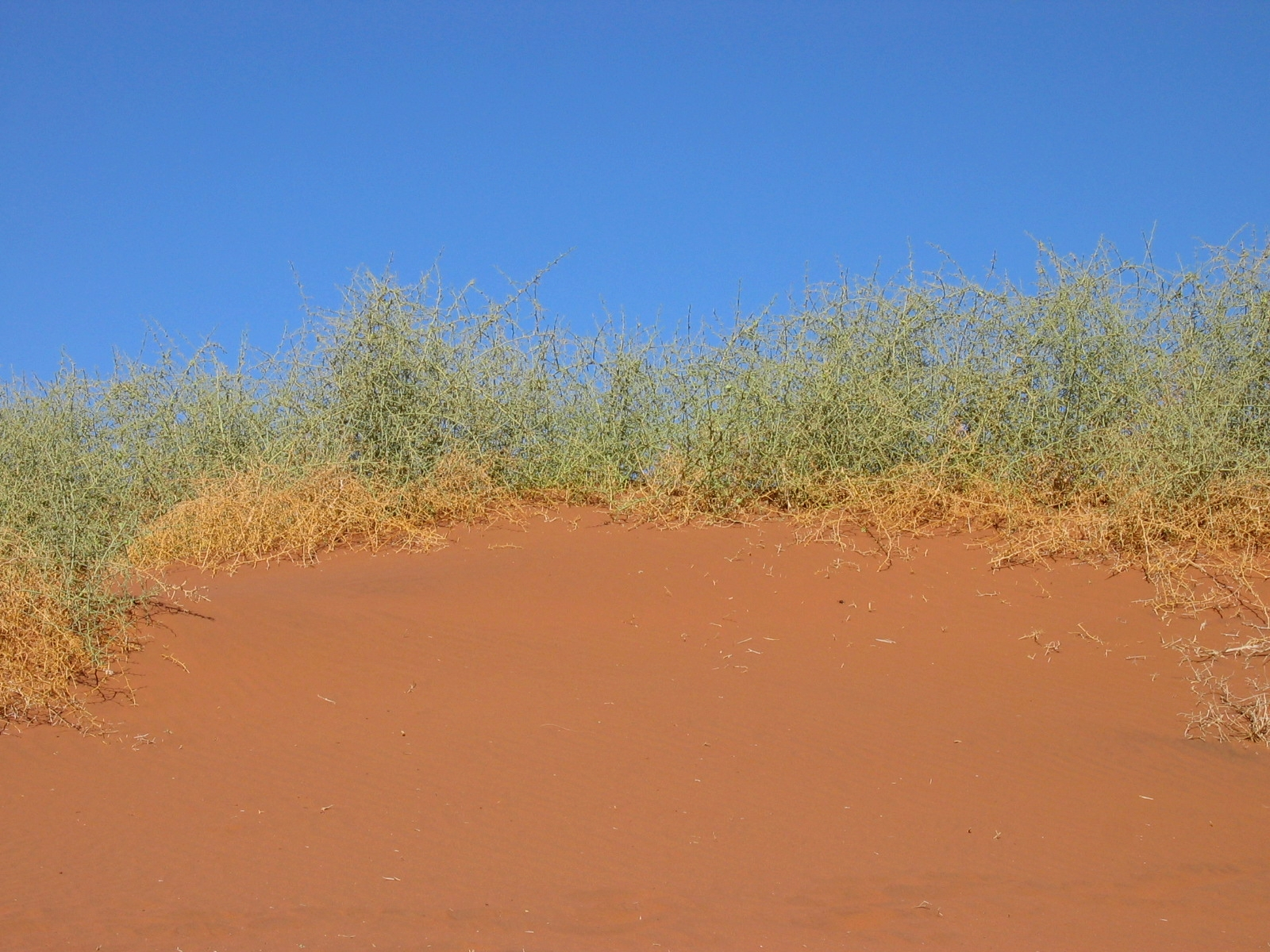
- Acanthosicyos in situ

Scientific classification
- Kingdom: Plantae
- Clade: Tracheophytes
- Clade: Angiosperms
- Clade: Eudicots
- Clade: Rosids
- Order: Cucurbitales
- Family: Cucurbitaceae
- Subfamily: Cucurbitoideae
- Tribe: Benincaseae
- Genus: Acanthosicyos; Welw. ex Benth. & Hook.f.

Species
- Acanthosicyos horridus; Acanthosicyos naudinianus

Synonyms
- Acanthosicyus Post & Kuntze, orth. var.

= Acanthosicyos =

Genus of flowering plants

Acanthosicyos is a genus of thorny shrubs of the botanical family Cucurbitaceae, subfamily Cucurbitoideae. The genus name comes from Ancient Greek ἄκανθα (ákantha), meaning "thorn", and σικύος (sikúos), meaning "gourd".

== Species ==
Endemic to the Namib Desert in Africa, this genus is represented by two known species including Acanthosicyos horridus, the nara melon, an important food plant in its native range. Both species are dioecious.

Image	Name	Distribution	Description
	Gemsbok cucumber (Acanthosicyos naudinianus)	western Botswana, eastern Namibia and northern South Africa	A trailing herb with large, palmate leaves. The fruit is mildly poisonous when unripe.
	Nara melon (Acanthosicyos horridus)	Native to Namib Desert but predominantly found within a narrow coastal strip in Namibia	It is almost exclusively found in sand dunes that have subterranean water supplies available to the plant. The nara plant is leafless, the modified stems and spines serve as the photosynthetic "organs" of the plant.

Both the Nara and the Gemsbok Cucumber are edible; however, eating unripe fruit is highly inadvisable due to the presence of chemicals which "burn" the throat and esophagus. The bushmen of the Kalahari eat the Gemsbok Cucumber after it has been roasted in a fire for a couple of hours. This cooking renders the "burning" chemicals harmless; even if the cooked pulp is still slightly bitter, the Bushman seem to relish eating them, sucking out the contents and either spitting out or chewing up the plentiful seeds.
