= Acanthoproctus diadematus =

Scientific classification
- Kingdom: Animalia
- Phylum: Arthropoda
- Clade: Pancrustacea
- Class: Insecta
- Order: Orthoptera
- Suborder: Ensifera
- Family: Tettigoniidae
- Genus: Acanthoproctus
- Species: A. diadematus

Binomial name
- Acanthoproctus diadematus Stål, 1858

Synonyms
- Acanthoproctus coronatus Karney, 1910; Acanthoproctus ibex Pictet, 1888; Hetrodes crassipes Walker, F., 1869; Hetrodes diadematus Stål, 1858

Species of cricket-like animal

Acanthoproctus diadematus (Namibia katydid or Nara cricket) is an armoured katydid, bush-cricket, or ground cricket endemic to the Namib Desert of southern Africa, where it lives in the tall sand dunes along the Kuiseb River in Namib-Naukluft National Park. The katydid feeds on the !nara melon endemic to the area.
