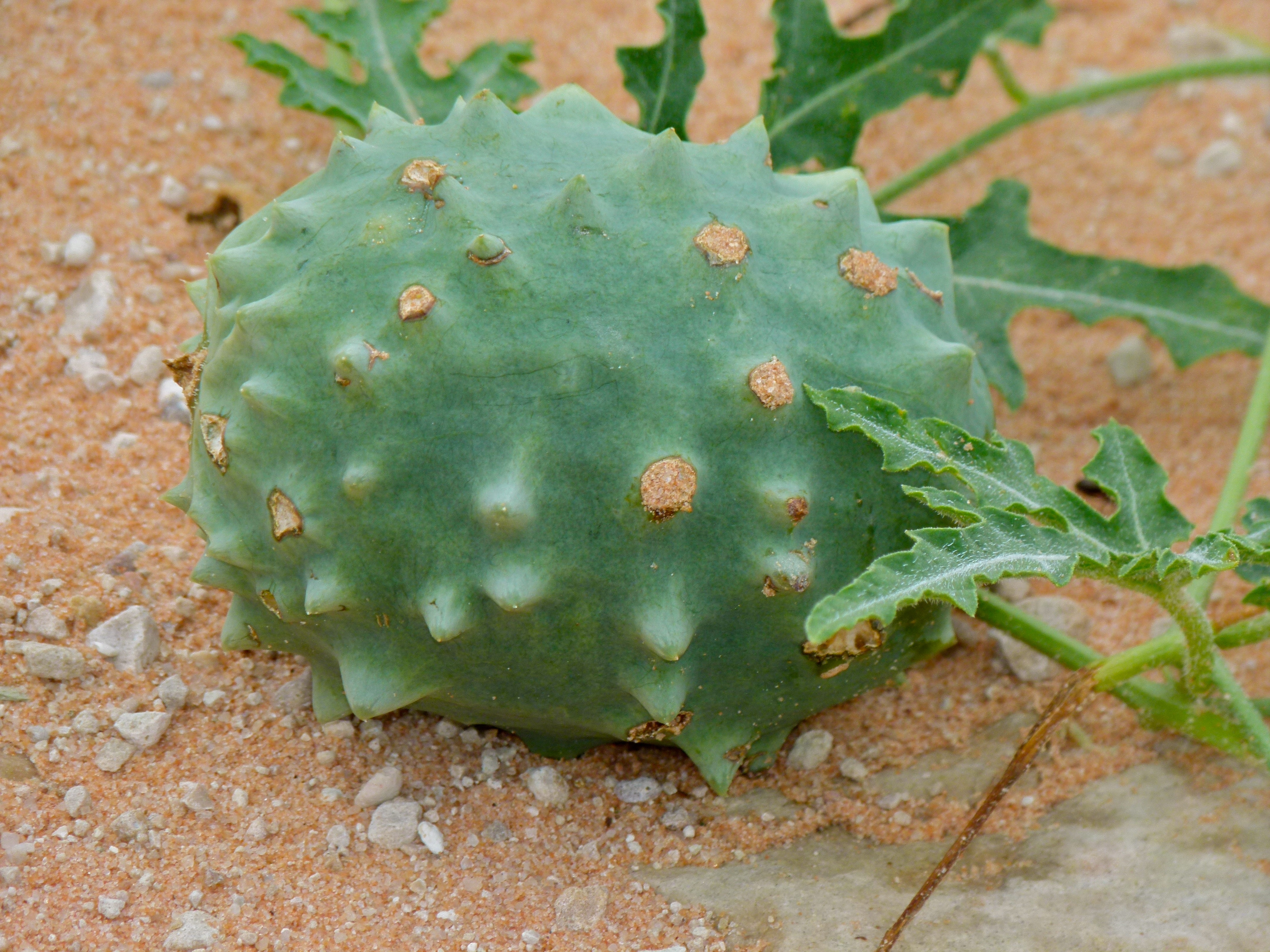

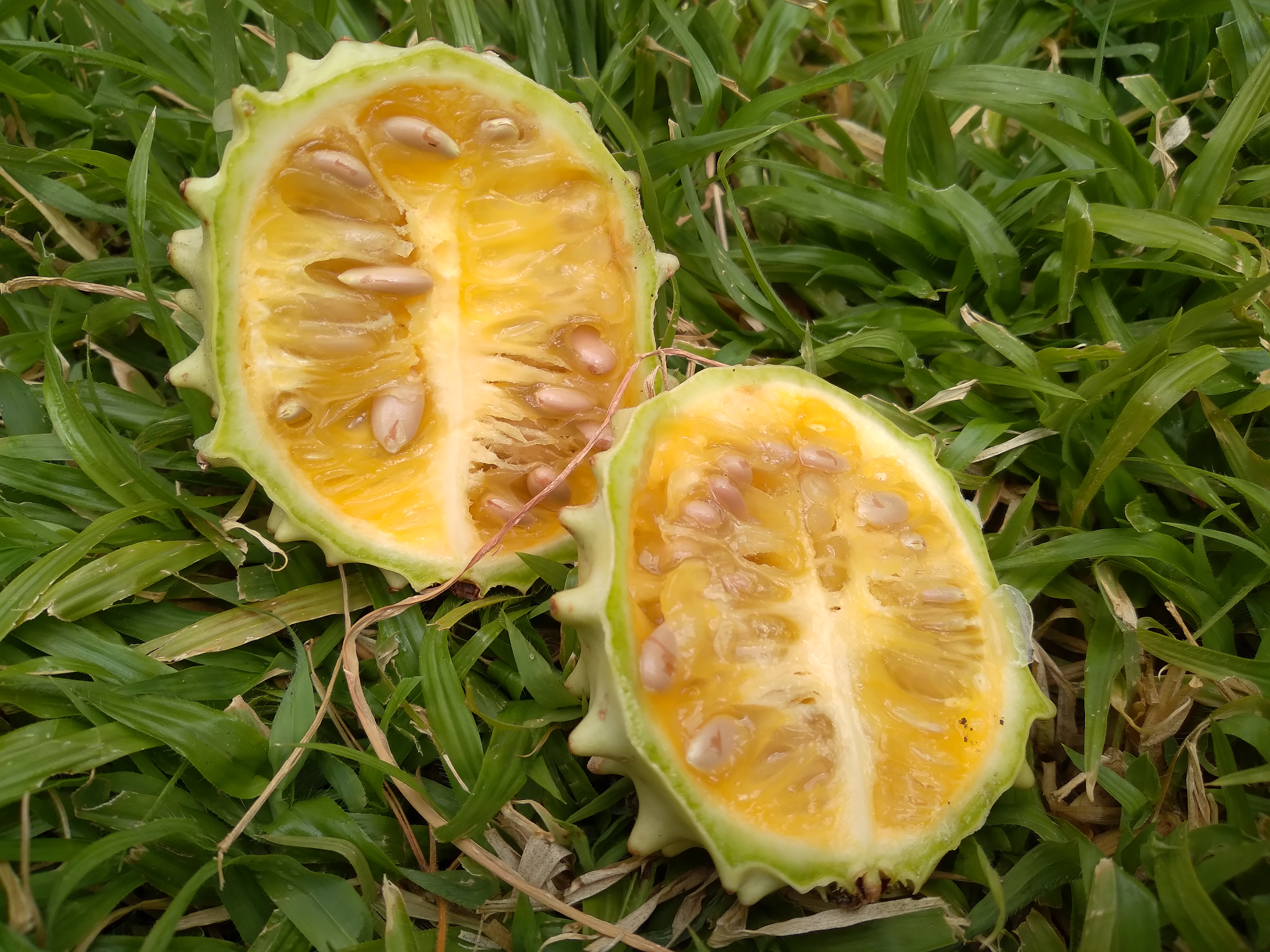

Conservation status
- Least Concern (IUCN 3.1)

Scientific classification
- Kingdom: Plantae
- Clade: Tracheophytes
- Clade: Angiosperms
- Clade: Eudicots
- Clade: Rosids
- Order: Cucurbitales
- Family: Cucurbitaceae
- Genus: Acanthosicyos
- Species: A. naudinianus

Binomial name
- Acanthosicyos naudinianus (Sond.) C.Jeffrey

Synonyms
- Cucumis naudinianus Sond.; Citrullus naudinianus (Sond.) Hook.f.; Colocynthis naudinianus (Sond.) Kuntze; Cucumis dissectifolius Naudin; Cucumis prophetarum Mey.; Cucumis prophetarum Mey. ex Cogn.; Pseudocucumis naudinianus (Sond.) C.Jeffrey

= Acanthosicyos naudinianus =

Species of melon endemic to Southern Africa

Acanthosicyos naudinianus, known as the Gemsbok cucumber, is a perennial African melon with edible fruits and seeds.

== Description ==
The leaves are typically deeply palmately 5-lobed and alternately arranged, while the stem may reach 6 meters in length. The stems feature tendrils which have been modified into weak spines. The flowers are yellow or white. It is dioecious, with male and female flowers on separate plants. The fruit, which is 4-12 centimetres long and covered in spines, starts out green and becomes a pale yellow when ripe. The fruit is edible, but eating it before it is ripe will cause a burning sensation in one's mouth. It is not poisonous, but if combined with the blood of the larvae of the Diamphidia beetle species, a poison is produced which can be used to make poison arrows. The tuberous roots, which may reach 1 metre in length, are poisonous.

== Distribution and habitat ==
A. naudinianus is found in southern Africa, specifically Namibia, Zambia, Zimbabwe, Botswana, Mozambique, Angola, and South Africa. Its native habitat is woodland, wooded grasslands, and grasslands. It prefers sandy soil and does not tolerate frost. It may be grown in USDA zone 9.
