= O. gazella =

O. gazella may refer to:

- Onthophagus gazella, the gazella scarab, a beetle species
- Oryx gazella, the gemsbok or gemsbuck, a large African antelope species

== See also ==
- Gazella
