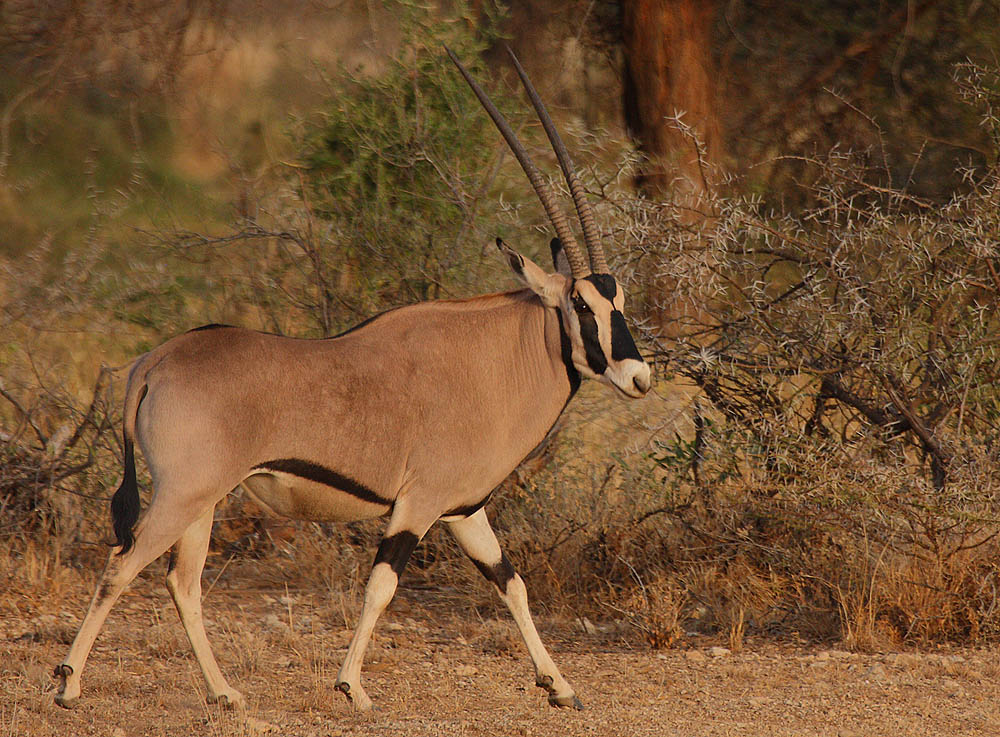

Conservation status
- Endangered (IUCN 3.1)

Scientific classification
- Kingdom: Animalia
- Phylum: Chordata
- Class: Mammalia
- Order: Artiodactyla
- Family: Bovidae
- Subfamily: Hippotraginae
- Genus: Oryx
- Species: O. beisa
- Subspecies: O. b. beisa

Trinomial name
- Oryx beisa beisa (Rüppell, 1835)
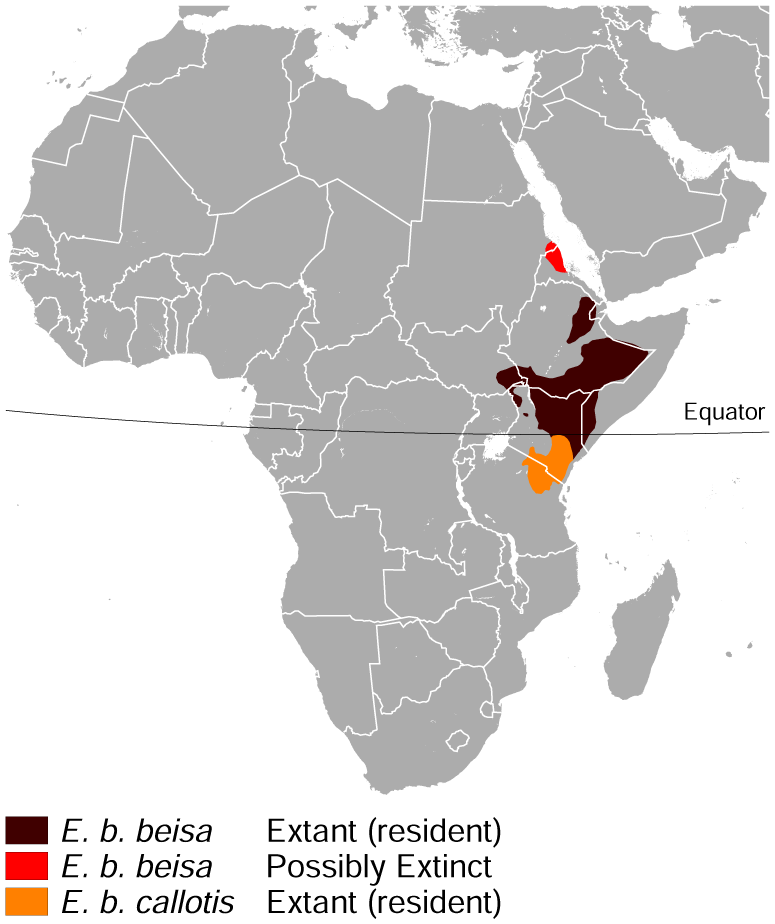
- Fringe-eared and common beisa oryx ranges

= Common beisa oryx =

Subspecies of mammal

The common beisa oryx (Oryx beisa beisa), also known as the beisa oryx, is the nominate subspecies of the East African oryx native to the Horn of Africa and Kenya. It is closely related to the fringe-eared oryx. There are four species of oryx, one of which has two distinct subspecies. Although they are very similar in appearance, they have a number of distinct characteristics that allow identification. Common beisa oryx have fringed ears and black tufts of hair that extend past their ears. However, all species of oryx are compact and muscular, with relative long bodies and broad necks. There are not any marked difference between male and female oryx. The common beisa oryx enjoys feeding on a variety of grass species. They feed during the day, when the plants hold the most water. During the dry season, they feed on poisonous Adenium plants.

== Habitat ==
The common beisa oryx once inhabited a large region of northeastern Africa, from Sudan down to Tanzania, but it has been going extinct rapidly. Now they mostly remain in Ethiopia and northern Kenya. In 1959, a boundary change in the Serengeti National Park excluded the area inhabited by the common beisa oryx. Recent observations (1974–1975) show that oryx are still only visitors to the Serengeti National Park, but there are indications that they may become resident in the future. Common beisa oryx stay in bushland and grassland areas. During the wet season, they move to high ground and avoid tall grass and saturated areas. They move great distances to find a perfect location and stay there for a few seasons.
