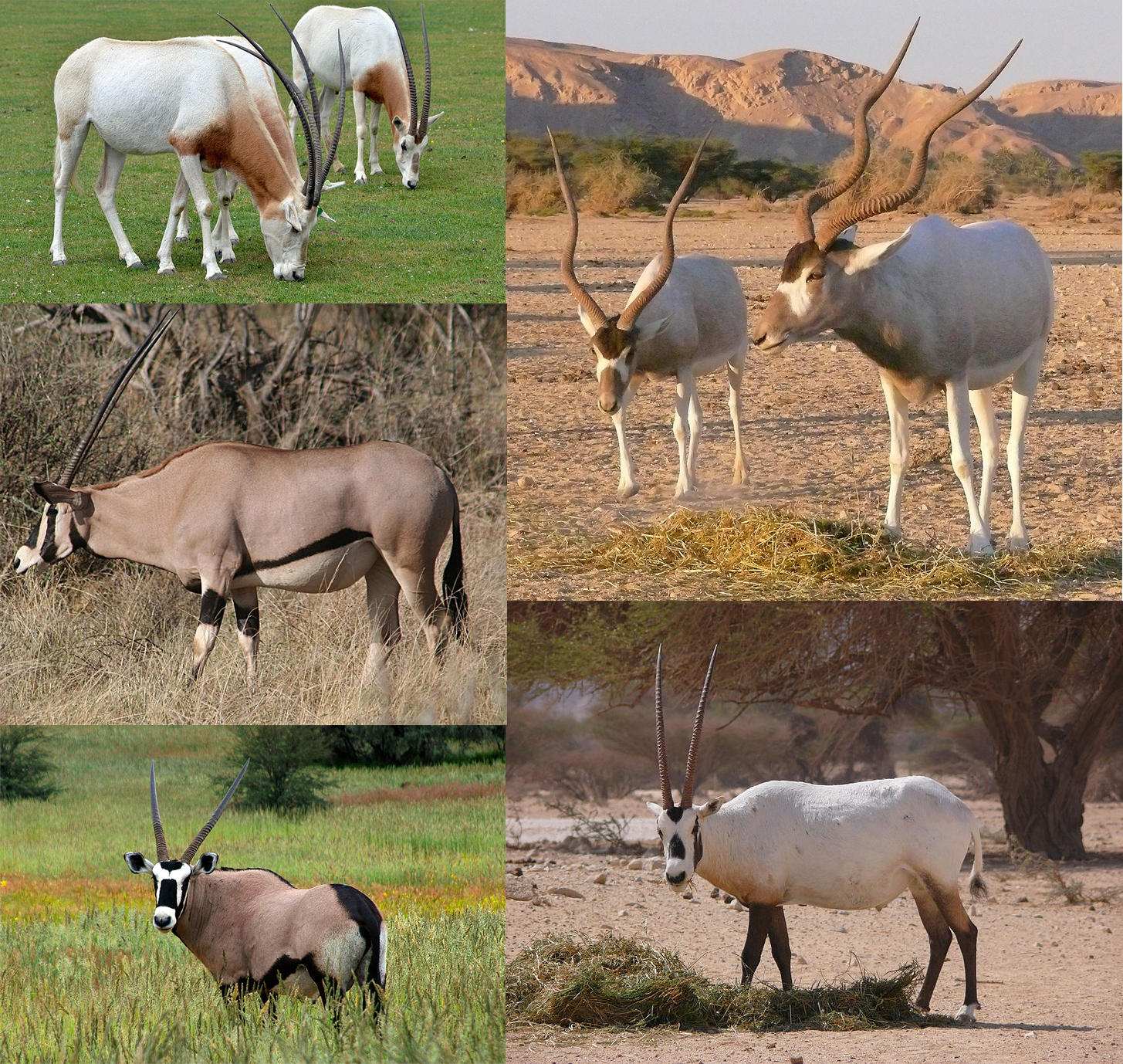
- clockwise from upper-right: Addax (Addax nasomaculatus), Arabian oryx (Oryx leucoryx), Gemsbok (Oryx gazella), East African oryx (Oryx beisa), and Scimitar oryx (Oryx dammah)

Scientific classification
- Kingdom: Animalia
- Phylum: Chordata
- Class: Mammalia
- Infraclass: Placentalia
- Order: Artiodactyla
- Family: Bovidae
- Subfamily: Hippotraginae; Sundevall, 1845

Genera
- Addax; Hippotragus; Oryx; †Palaeoryx

= Hippotraginae =

Hippotraginae Temporal range: Late Miocene to present

Subfamily of antelopes

The subfamily Hippotraginae, alternatively considered the tribe Hippotragini is a clade of antelopes in the family Bovidae. They are grazers, rather than browsers. The family name comes from Ancient Greek ἵππος (híppos), meaning "horse", and τράγος (trágos), meaning "he-goat". They have slightly horse-like characteristics of body size and proportions: long legs and a solid body with a relatively thick muscular neck.

== Genera ==
- Subfamily Hippotraginae

Image	Genus	Living species
	Hippotragus Sundevall, 1845	Roan antelope, Hippotragus equinus; Sable antelope, Hippotragus niger; Giant sable antelope Hippotragus niger varani; Bluebuck, Hippotragus leucophaeus (extinct)
	Oryx de Blainville, 1816	East African oryx, Oryx beisa; Common beisa oryx, Oryx beisa beisa; Fringe-eared oryx, Oryx beisa callotis; Scimitar oryx, Oryx dammah; Gemsbok, Oryx gazella; Arabian oryx, Oryx leucoryx
	Addax Laurillard, 1841	Addax, Addax nasomaculatus
