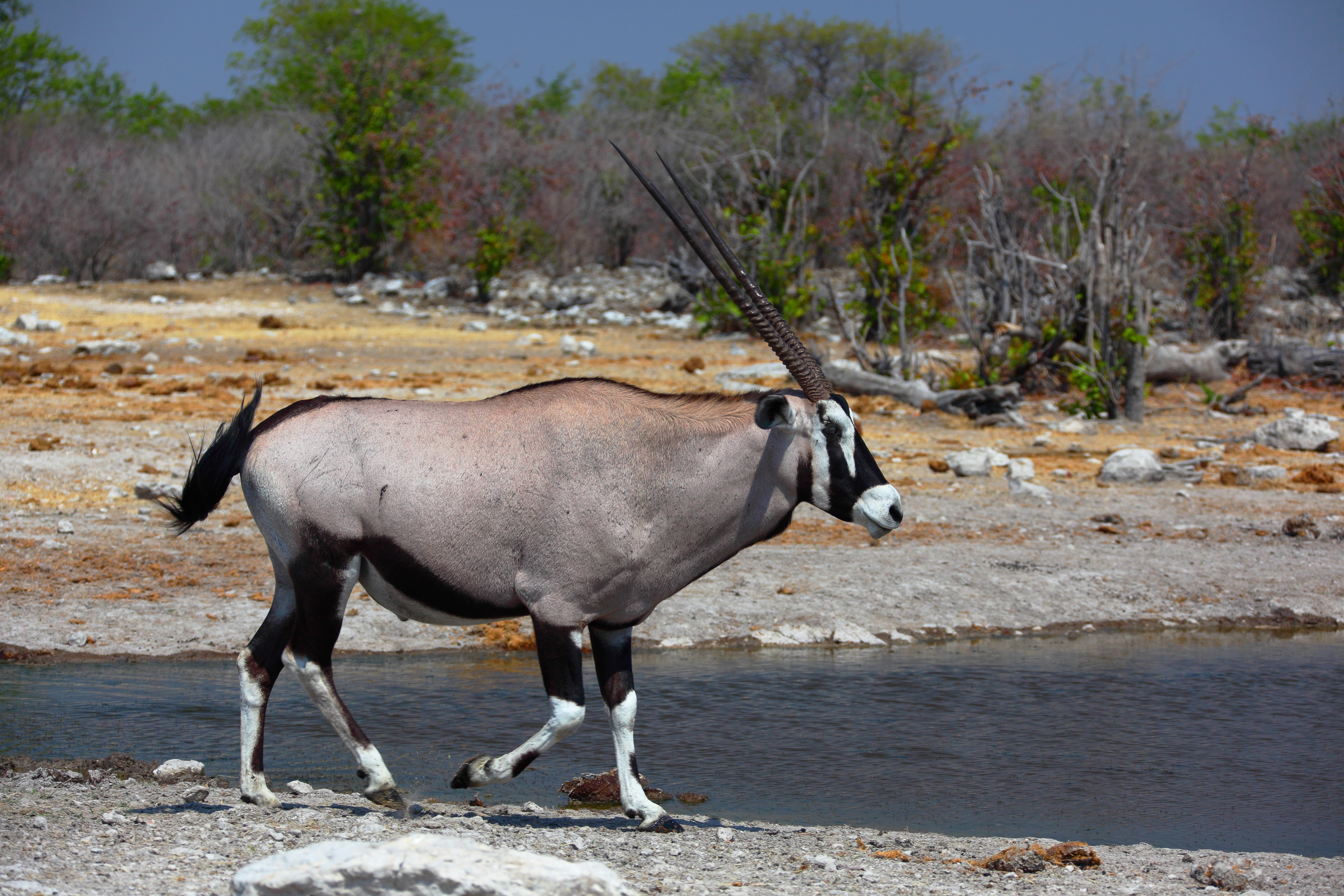
- A male gemsbok (Oryx gazella) at Etosha National Park in Namibia

Scientific classification
- Kingdom: Animalia
- Phylum: Chordata
- Class: Mammalia
- Order: Artiodactyla
- Family: Bovidae
- Subfamily: Hippotraginae
- Genus: Oryx (de Blainville, 1816)

Type species
- Antilope oryx (Pallas, 1777)

Species
- Oryx beisa (Rüppell, 1835); Oryx dammah (Cretzschmar, 1827); Oryx gazella (Linnaeus, 1758); Oryx leucoryx (Pallas, 1766)

= Oryx =

Genus of mammals (large antelopes)

Oryx (/ˈɒrɪks/ ORR-iks) is a genus consisting of four large antelope species called oryxes. Their pelage is pale with contrasting dark markings in the face and on the legs, and their long horns are almost straight and annulated. The exception is the scimitar oryx, which lacks dark markings on the legs, only has faint dark markings on the head, has an ochre neck, and has horns that are clearly decurved. All oryx species prefer near-desert conditions and can survive without water for long periods.

The Arabian oryx was only saved from extinction through a captive-breeding program and reintroduction to the wild. The scimitar oryx, which was listed as extinct in the wild, also relied on a captive-breeding program for its survival.

== Etymology ==
The term "oryx" comes from the Greek word ὄρυξ óryx meaning "pickaxe", because its long and pointed horns look similar to the tool's end. The Greek plural form is ὄρυγες óryges, although "oryxes" has been established in English. Herodotus mentions a type of gazelle in Libya called ὄρυς, orus, probably related to the verb ὀρύσσω, orussō, or ὀρύττω, oruttō, meaning "to dig". White oryxes are known to dig holes in the sand.

== Species ==
=== Arabian oryx ===
The Arabian oryx (Oryx leucoryx, Arabic: المها), became extinct in the wild in 1972 in the Arabian Peninsula. It was reintroduced in 1982 in Oman, but poaching has reduced its numbers there. One of the largest populations of Arabian oryxes exists on Sir Bani Yas Island in the United Arab Emirates. Additional populations have been reintroduced in Qatar, Bahrain, Israel, Jordan, and Saudi Arabia. As of 2011, the total wild population is over 1,000, and 6,000–7,000 are being held in captivity. In 2011, the IUCN downgraded its threat category from extinct in the wild to vulnerable, the first species to have changed back in this way.

=== Scimitar oryx ===
The scimitar oryx, also called the scimitar-horned oryx (Oryx dammah), of North Africa used to be listed as extinct in the wild, but it is now declared as endangered. Unconfirmed surviving populations have been reported in central Niger and Chad, and a semi-wild population currently inhabiting a fenced nature reserve in Tunisia is being expanded for reintroduction to the wild in that country. Several thousand are held in captivity around the world.

=== East African oryx and gemsbok ===
The East African oryx (Oryx beisa) inhabits eastern Africa and the closely related gemsbok (Oryx gazella) inhabits southern Africa. The gemsbok is monotypic and the East African oryx has two subspecies; the common beisa oryx (O. b. beisa) and the fringe-eared oryx (O. b. callotis). In the past, both were considered subspecies of the gemsbok. The East African oryx is an endangered species, whereas the gemsbok is not.

Gemsbok were introduced in New Mexico by the Department of Game and Fish in the late 1960s and early 1970s as an experiment in offering a unique hunting opportunity to New Mexico residents. Between 1969 and 1973, 95 oryx were released onto White Sands Missile Range. White Sands Missile Range, located between the cities of Albuquerque, NM and El Paso, TX, is a 3,200 square mile US Army facility which also hosts White Sands National Park. Researchers believed that the population would never grow beyond 500 to 600 and would remain within the Tularosa Basin. However, the animals proved to be extremely opportunistic, and quickly spread into the San Andres Mountains to the north and west of Tularosa Basin.

At one time, numbers of oryx in New Mexico were estimated to be around 6,000 (original release numbers were less than 100). Today, numbers have been held around the 2,000 mark through managed hunting efforts. The success of the oryx in New Mexico is due in part to the abundance of food. In Africa, they eat grasses, forbs, and melons. In New Mexico, they feed on desert grasses, yucca, buffalo gourds, and mesquite bean pods. They are especially adapted to desert life and can go a long time without drinking water. This area also lacks a way to control the population. Lions and other natural predators cull the population in Africa, with only 10% of calves reaching one year of age. In New Mexico, predators like coyotes and mountain lions are not effective at controlling numbers, allowing the oryx to reproduce without restriction.

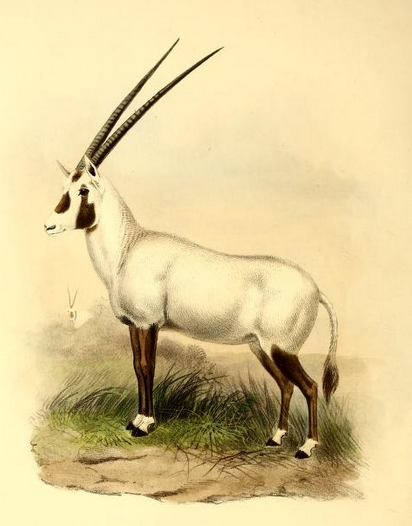
Oryx leucoryx

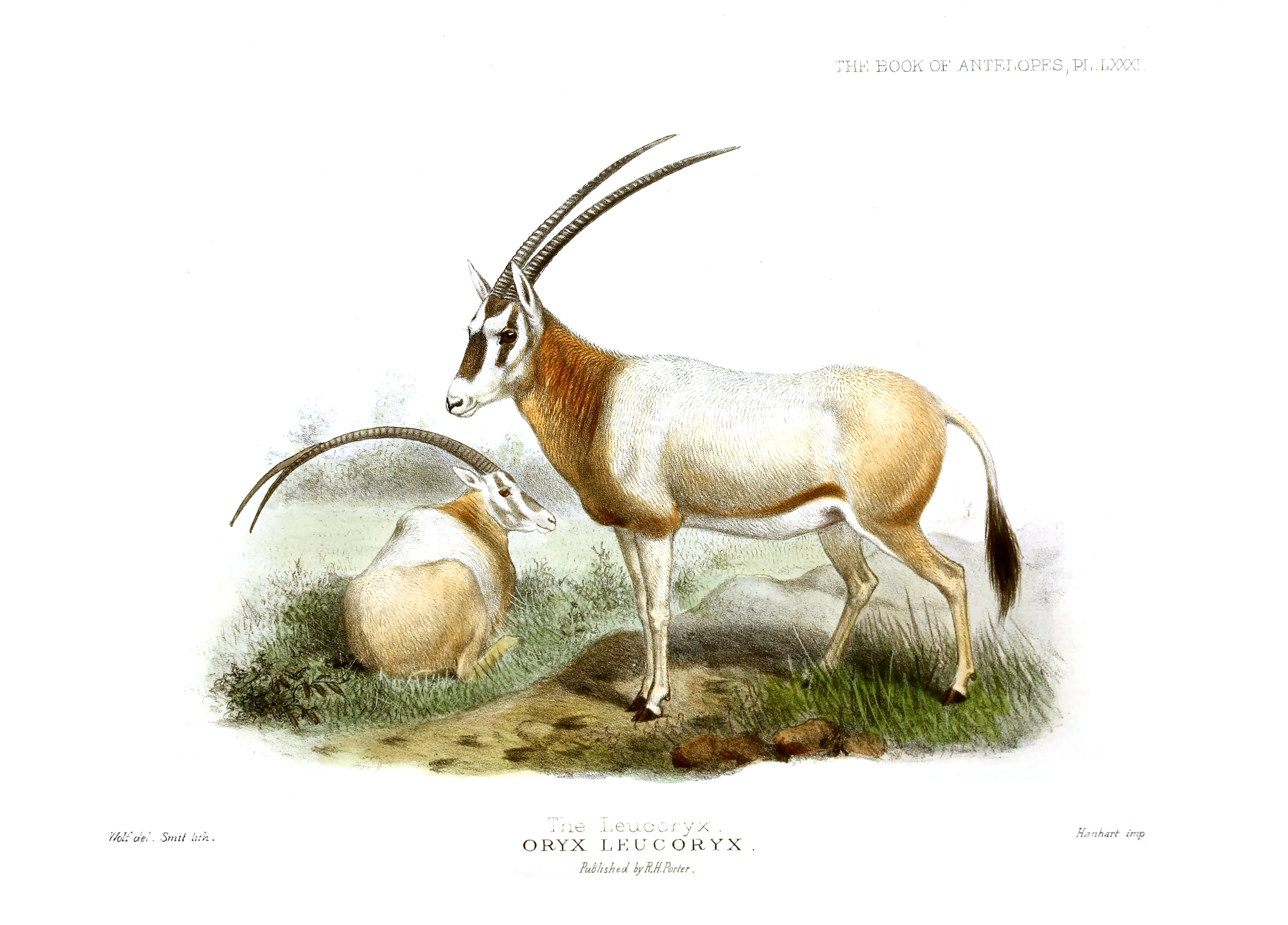
Oryx dammah is the only oryx with clearly curved horns, an ochre neck, and no dark markings on the legs.

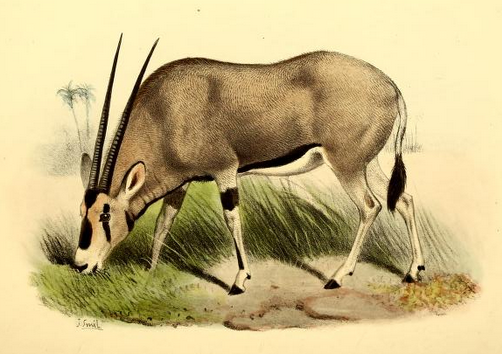
Oryx beisa resembles the closely related O. gazella, but the latter has an entirely black tail and more black to the legs and lower flanks.

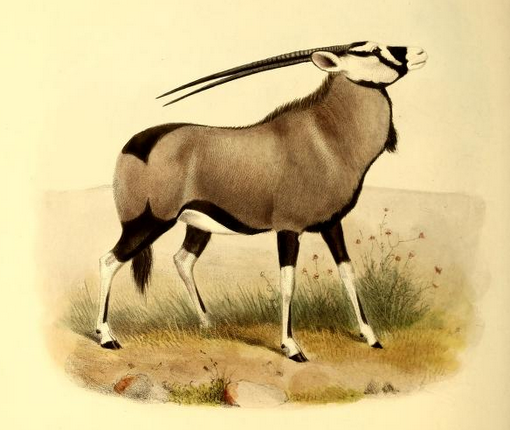
Oryx gazella

== Classification ==
- Family Bovidae
  - Subfamily Hippotraginae
    - Genus Oryx
      - Scimitar oryx, O. dammah
      - Gemsbok, O. gazella
      - East African oryx, O. beisa (formerly in O. gazella)
        - Common beisa oryx, O. b. beisa
        - Fringe-eared oryx, O. b. callotis
      - Arabian oryx, O. leucoryx

== Ecology ==
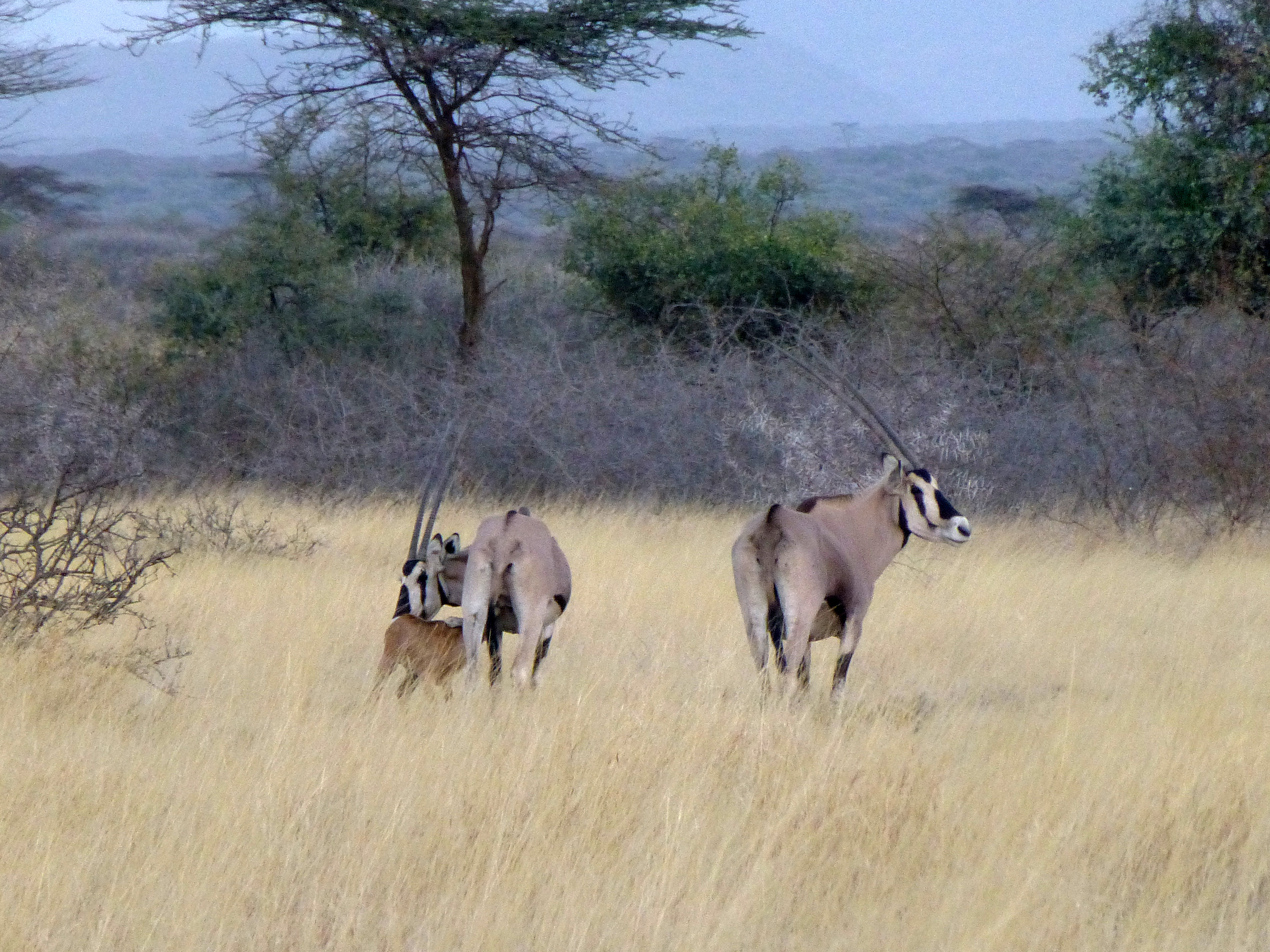
East African oryx in the Awash National Park, Ethiopia

They live in herds of up to 600 animals. Newborn calves are able to run with the herd immediately after birth. Both males and females possess permanent horns. The horns are narrow and straight except in the scimitar oryx, where they curve backwards like a scimitar. The horns can be lethal: oryxes have been known to kill lions with them, and they are thus sometimes called sabre antelopes (not to be confused with the sable antelope). The horns also make the animals a prized game trophy, which has led to the near-extinction of the two northern species.

=== As an introduced species ===
Between 1969 and 1977, the New Mexico Department of Game and Fish in the US intentionally released 95 gemsbok into its state's White Sands Missile Range and that population is now estimated between 3,000 and 6,000 animals. Within the state of New Mexico, oryxes are classified as "big game" and can be hunted.

== Oryxes in popular culture ==
The oryx is the national animal of Namibia and Qatar. Qatar's airline company Qatar Airways has an oryx as its logo.

The main boss of the MMO game Realm of the Mad God is Oryx the Mad God, named after the creator of the original sprite sheets, Oryx. His four direct subordinates also bear the names of four South African species of oryx.

Oryxes appear briefly, along with many other species of animal, in the Talk Talk music video It's My Life.

In the video game Tom Clancy's Rainbow Six Siege, a playable defending operator nicknamed Oryx was introduced in Year 5 Season 1. His ability is called "Remah Dash," where he can charge to break holes in walls and knock down enemies.

Oryx is a nickname for a character in Margaret Atwood's book Oryx and Crake.

Oryx is also the main antagonist's name in the video game Destiny: The Taken King, a god who seeks vengeance on the player, known as a Guardian, after they killed his son Crota. He is killed by the player in the raid "King's Fall". He is portrayed as "Oryx, the Taken King".

The Oryx is mentioned in Pliny's Natural History, in which he writes, "There is a wild beast, named by the Egyptians Oryx, which, when the star [Sirius] rises, is said to stand opposite to it, to look steadfastly at it, and then to sneeze, as if it were worshiping it."

In the 1994 film and 2019 remake of The Lion King and The Lion King II: Simba's Pride, the two species of oryxes in Hell's Gate National Park are the East African oryx and gemsbok.

The Joint Commission's hospital performance measurement program is named after the oryx.
