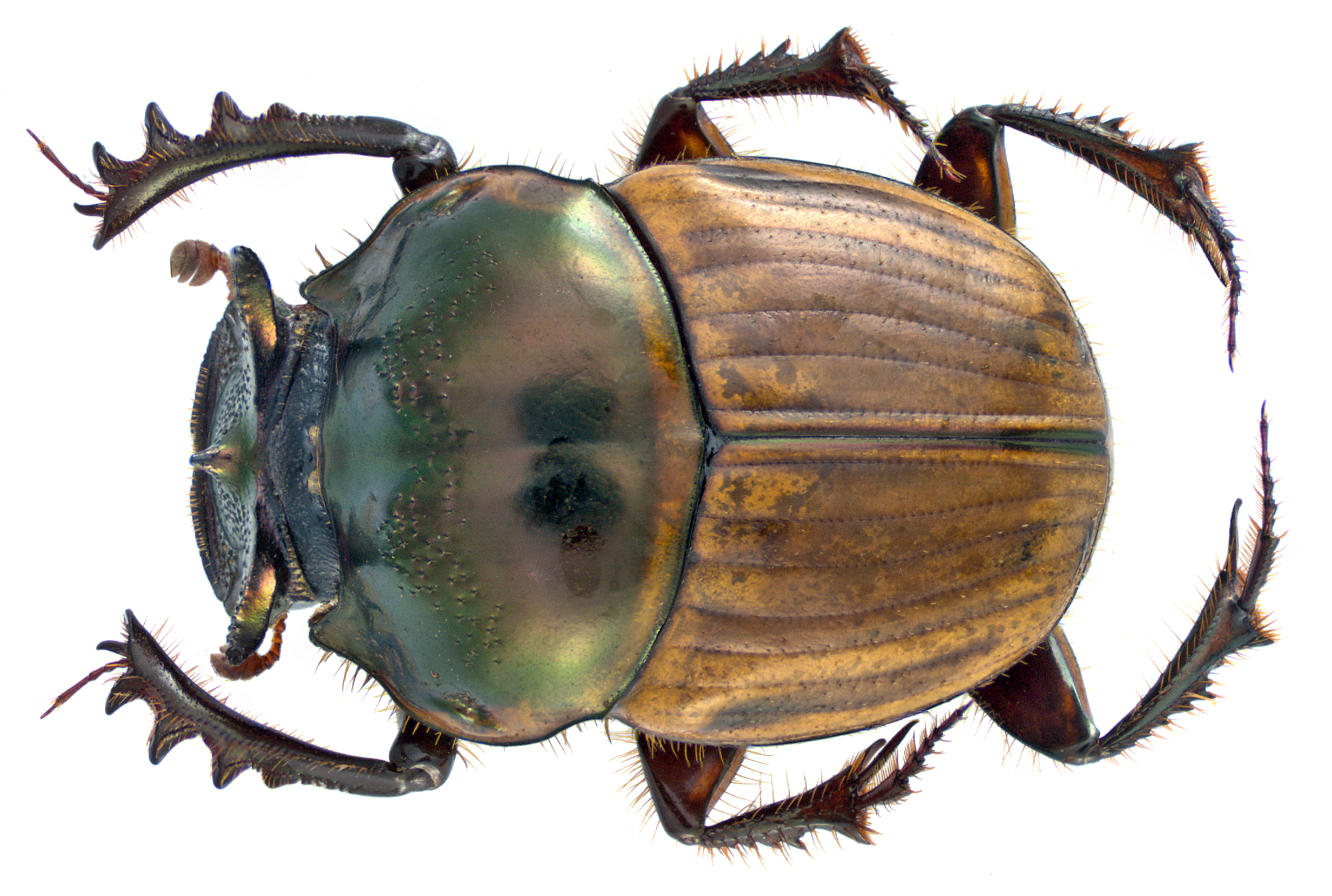

Scientific classification
- Kingdom: Animalia
- Phylum: Arthropoda
- Class: Insecta
- Order: Coleoptera
- Suborder: Polyphaga
- Infraorder: Scarabaeiformia
- Family: Scarabaeidae
- Subfamily: Scarabaeinae
- Tribe: Onthophagini
- Genus: Digitonthophagus
- Species: D. bonasus

Binomial name
- Digitonthophagus bonasus (Fabricius 1775)

Synonyms
- Scarabeaus bonasus Fabricius, 1775; Onthophagus (Digitonthophagus) bonasus Balthasar, 1963; Onthophagus bonasus Arrow, 1931; Onthophagus bonasus Chandra, 2005

= Digitonthophagus bonasus =

Species of beetle

Digitonthophagus bonasus, is a species of dung beetle found in India, Sri Lanka, Pakistan, Nepal, Myanmar, Thailand, Afghanistan, Vietnam and Cambodia.

== Description ==
This shiny, very broadly oval and convex species has an average length of about 12 to 17 mm. Body testaceous yellowish. Head, and pronotum are greenish-black except a narrow pale margin at the sides and base. Elytral suture, and the upper surface of the femora and tibiae also greenish-black. Legs and sides of the body covered with yellowish hair. Head semicircular with very strongly reflexed front margin. Clypeus finely and closely granulate. In male, a short, acute, erect horn located in the middle of the forehead, which is backwardly directed with a tubercle. Pronotum very smooth in front and behind, but scattered granules are found in its middle part. Elytra finely striate with minute setigerous punctures in intervals. Pygidium consists with an angulate basal carina.

== Gallery ==
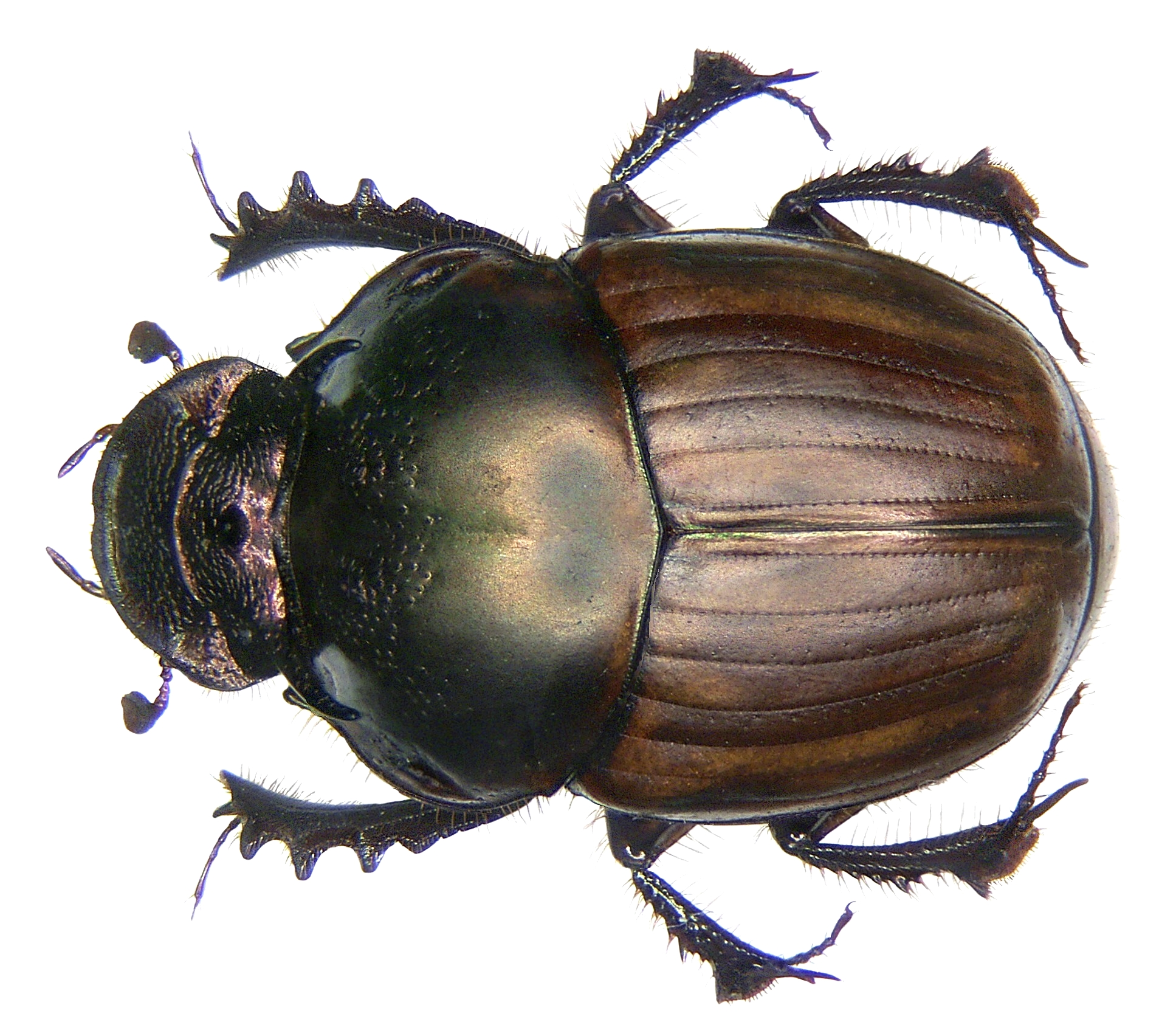

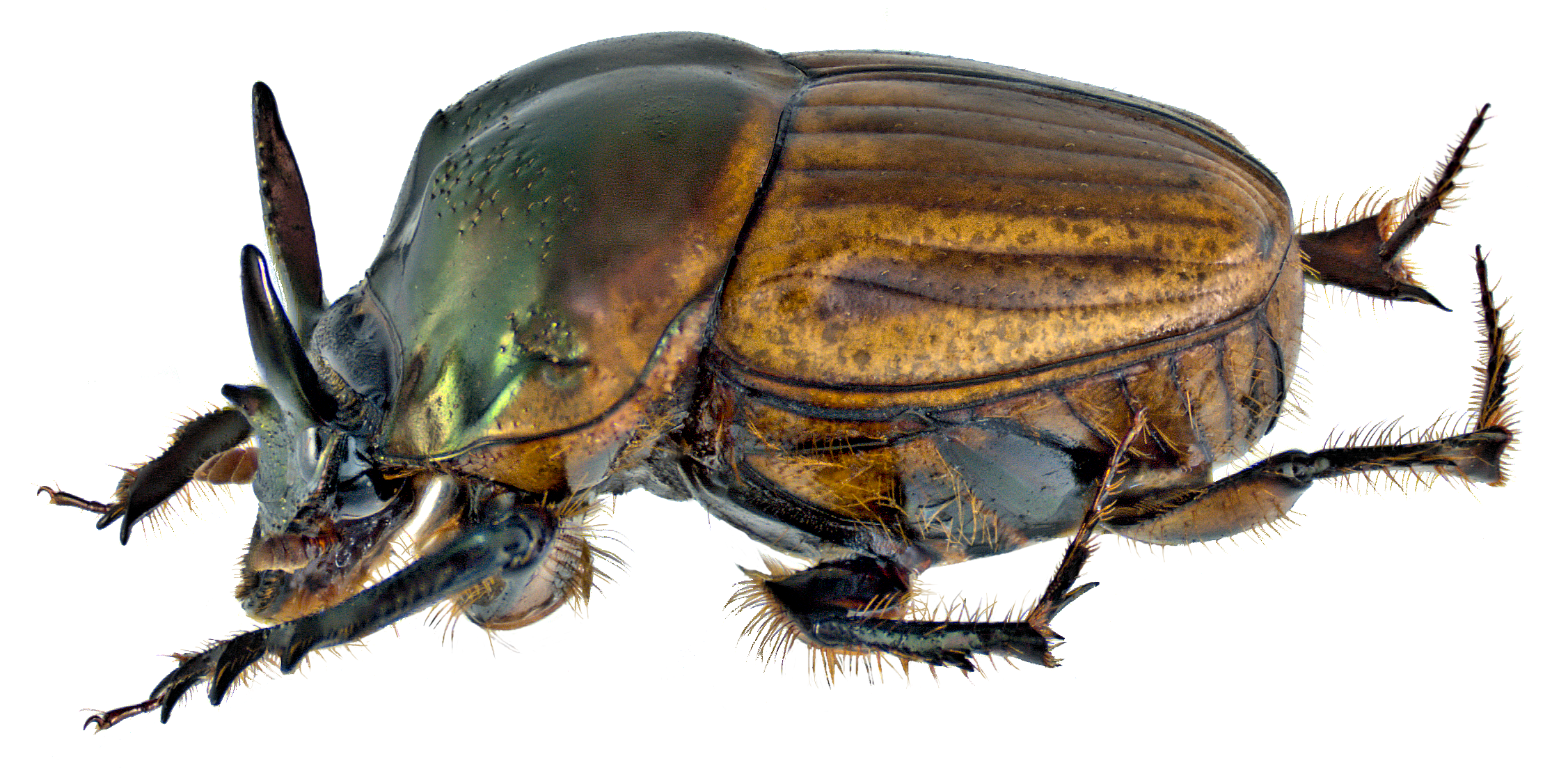

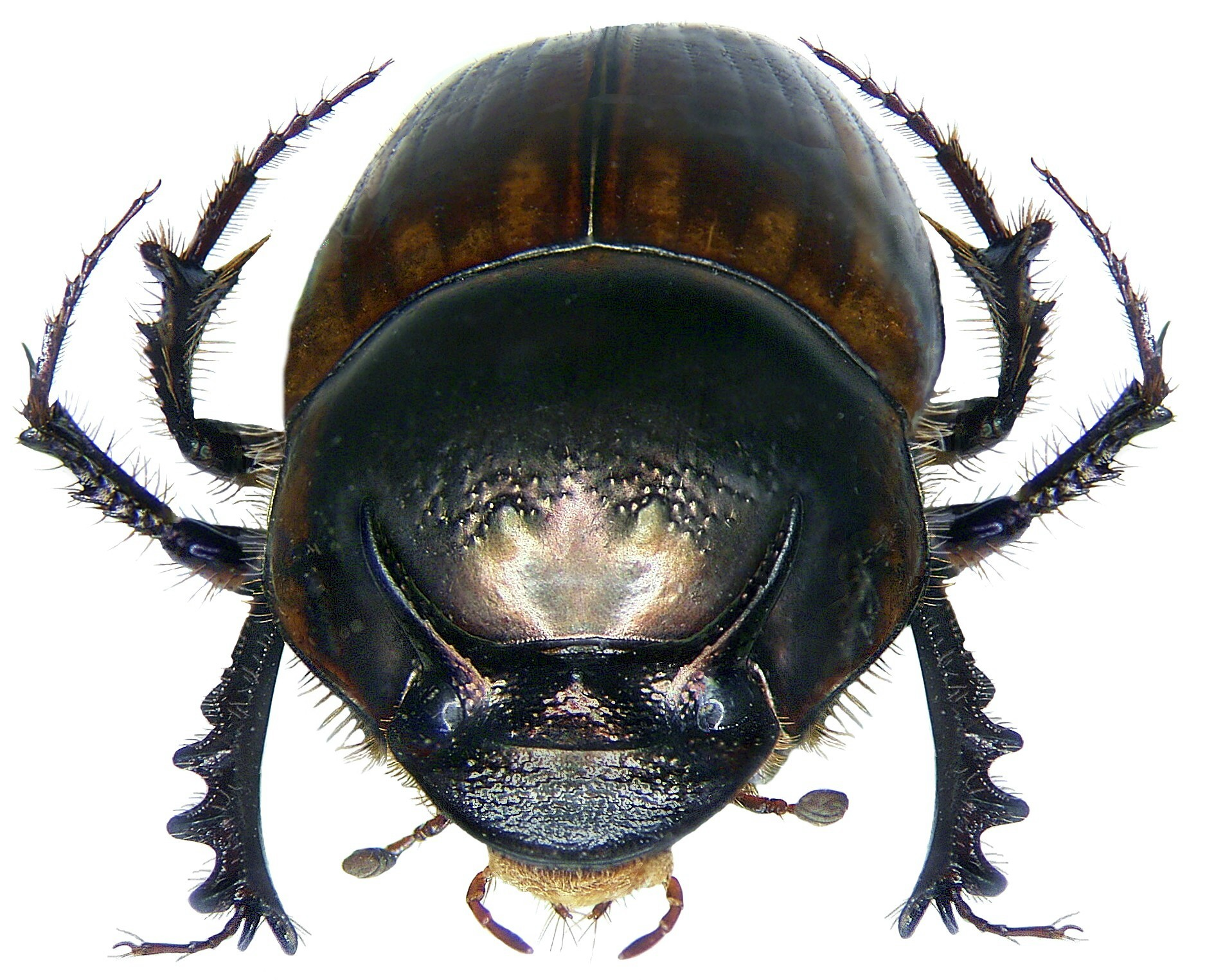
