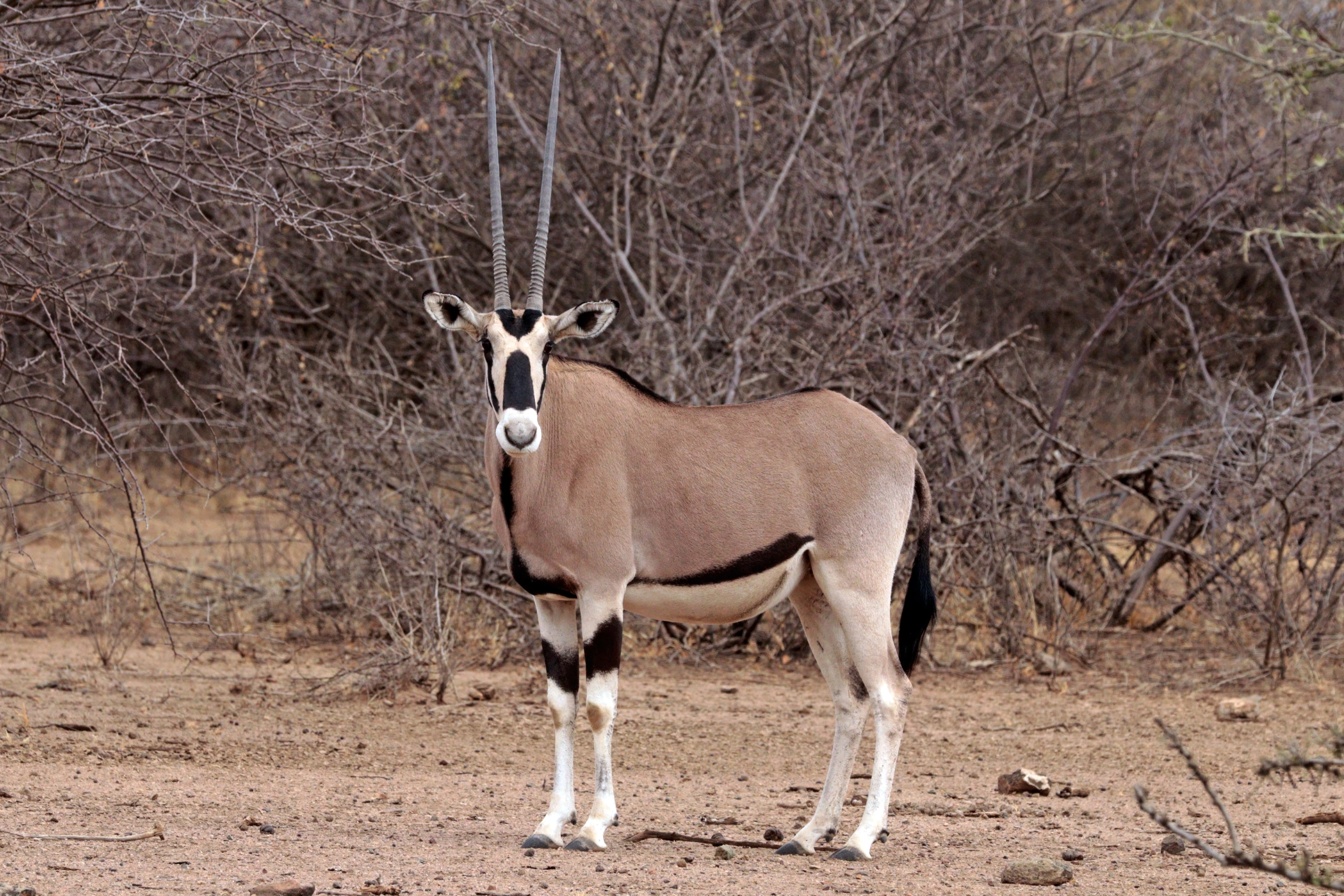
- O. b. beisa (female); Awash National Park, Ethiopia

Conservation status
- Endangered (IUCN 3.1)

Scientific classification
- Kingdom: Animalia
- Phylum: Chordata
- Class: Mammalia
- Infraclass: Placentalia
- Order: Artiodactyla
- Family: Bovidae
- Subfamily: Hippotraginae
- Genus: Oryx
- Species: O. beisa

Binomial name
- Oryx beisa (Rüppell, 1835)

Subspecies
- O. b. beisa O. b. callotis
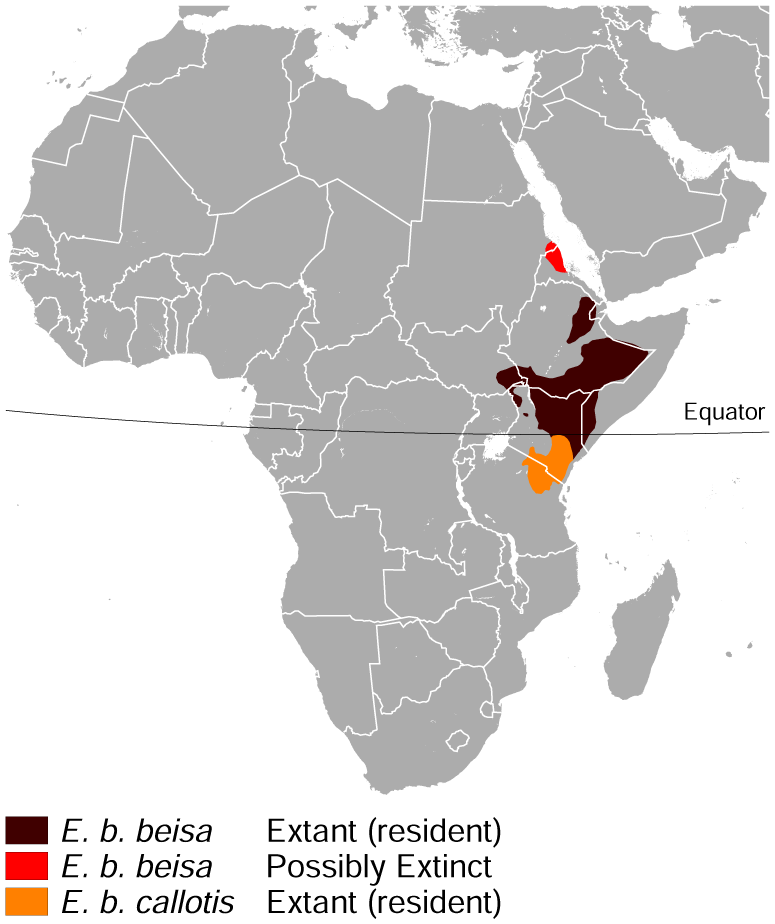
- East African oryx range.
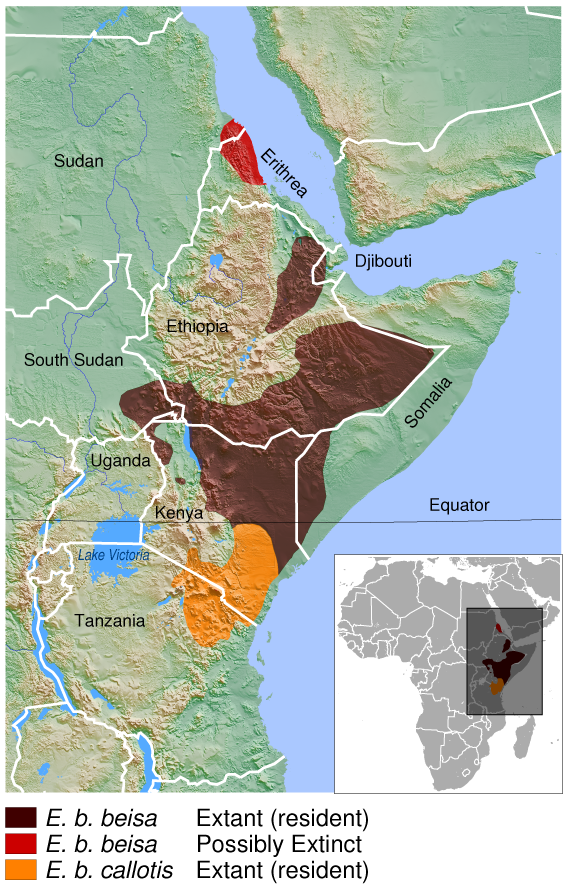
- Enlarged distribution map.

= East African oryx =

Species of mammal

The East African oryx (Oryx beisa), also known as the beisa, is a species of medium-sized antelope from East Africa. It has two subspecies: the common beisa oryx (Oryx beisa beisa) found in steppe and semidesert throughout the Horn of Africa Somalia and north of the Tana River, and the fringe-eared oryx (Oryx beisa callotis) south of the Tana River in southern Kenya Somalia and parts of Tanzania. The species is listed as Endangered by the IUCN.

In the past, some taxonomists considered it a subspecies of the gemsbok (Oryx gazella), but they are genetically distinct; the diploid chromosome count is 56 for the beisa and 58 for the gemsbok.

== Description ==
The East African oryx stands between 0.79 and 1.25 m (2.6 and 4.1 ft) tall at the shoulder and typically weighs between 220 and 460 lb (100 and 209 kg). It has a grey coat with a white underside, separated from the grey by a stripe of black, with black stripes where the head attaches to the neck, along the nose, and from the eye to the mouth and on the forehead. The mane is small and chestnut-coloured; the ringed horns are thin and straight. They are found on both sexes and typically measure 75–80 cm (30–31 in). Comparably, the gemsbok has an entirely black tail, a black patch at the base of the tail, and more black on the legs (including a patch on the hindlegs) and lower flanks. The smaller Arabian oryx is overall whiter with largely dark legs.

== Behaviour ==
East African oryx live in semidesert and steppes, where they eat grasses, leaves, fruit and buds. During periods of dehydration, they limit water losses by allowing their body temperatures to increase (so as to avoid perspiration). They gather in herds of five to 40 animals, often with females moving at the front and a large male guarding from the rear. Some older males are solitary. Radio tracking studies show the solitary males are often accompanied for brief periods by breeding-condition females, so it is probable they are executing a strategy to maximise their chances of reproduction.

== Gallery ==
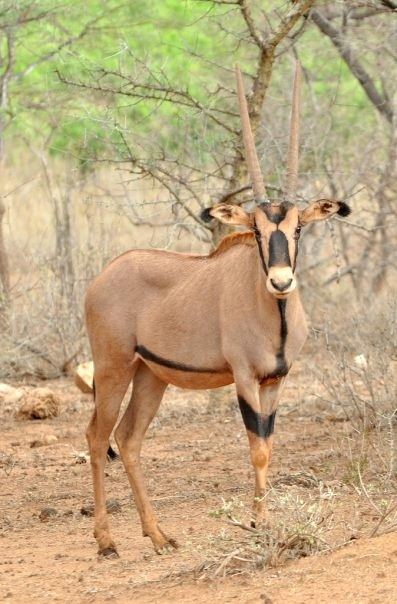
Fringe-eared oryx (O. b. callotis)

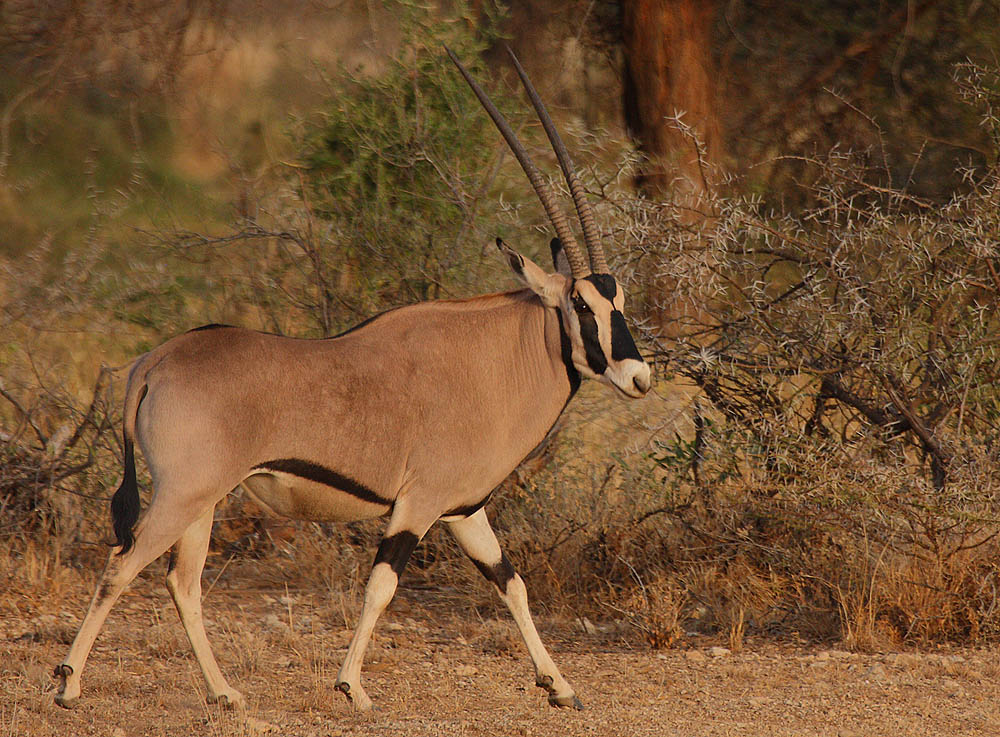
Common beisa oryx (O. b. beisa)

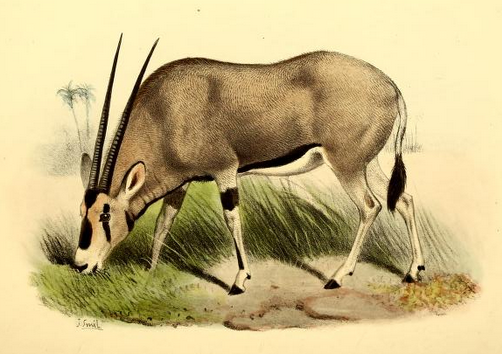
Illustration

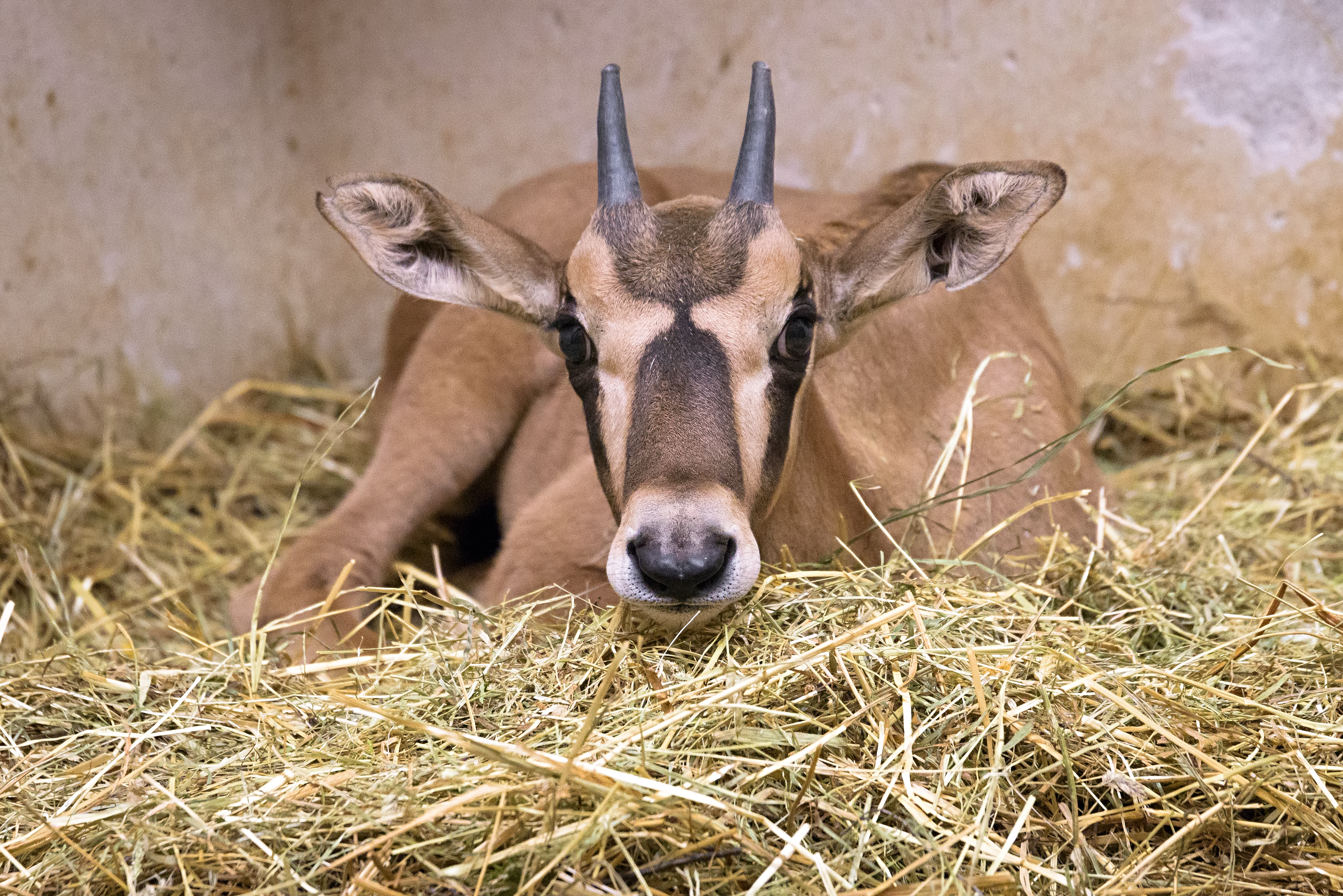
In captivity
