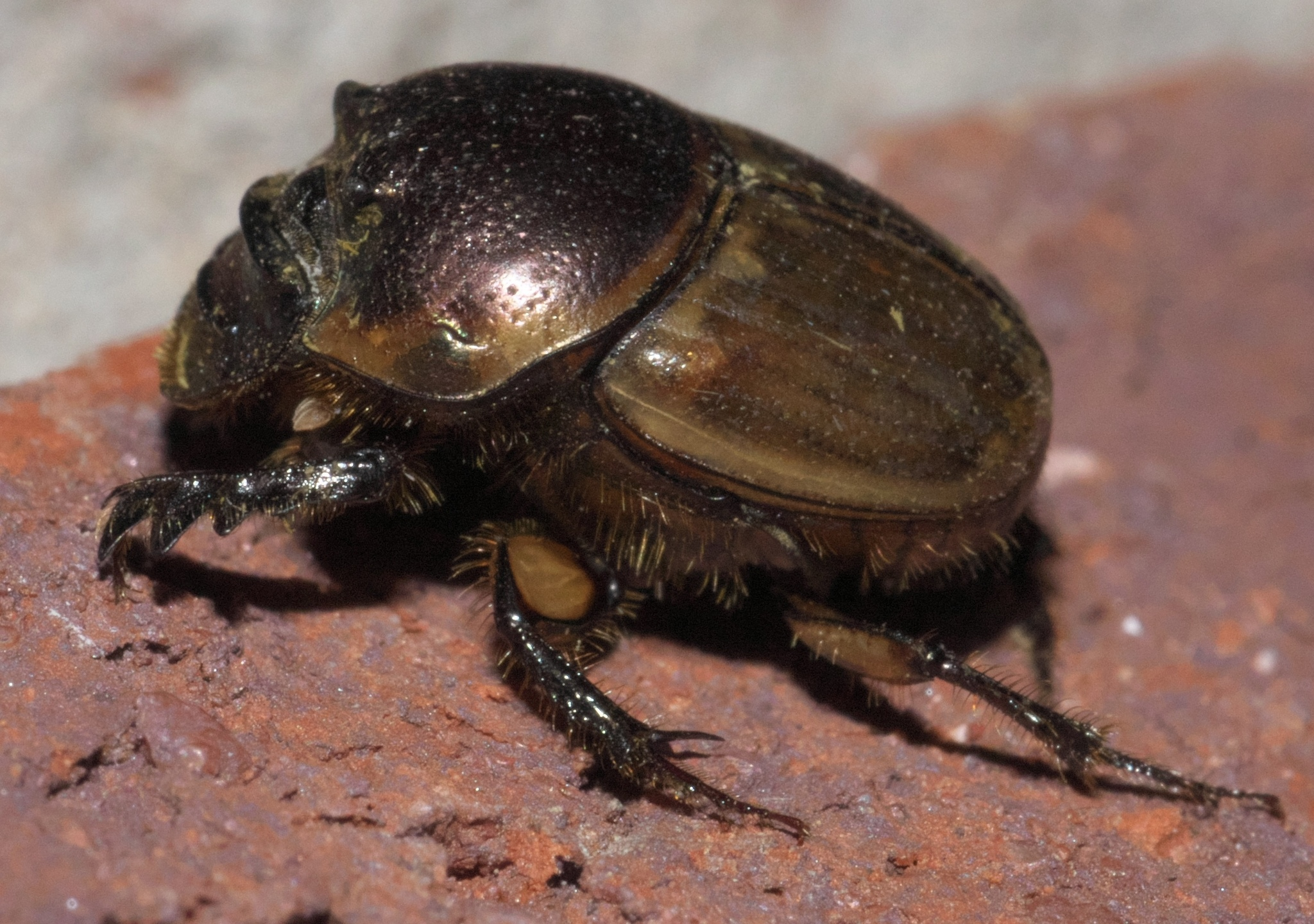
- Digitonthophagus gazella, Gazella Dung Beetle, Oklahoma

Scientific classification
- Kingdom: Animalia
- Phylum: Arthropoda
- Clade: Pancrustacea
- Class: Insecta
- Order: Coleoptera
- Suborder: Polyphaga
- Infraorder: Scarabaeiformia
- Family: Scarabaeidae
- Subfamily: Scarabaeinae
- Tribe: Onthophagini
- Genus: Digitonthophagus; Balthasar, 1959

= Digitonthophagus =

Genus of scarab beetles

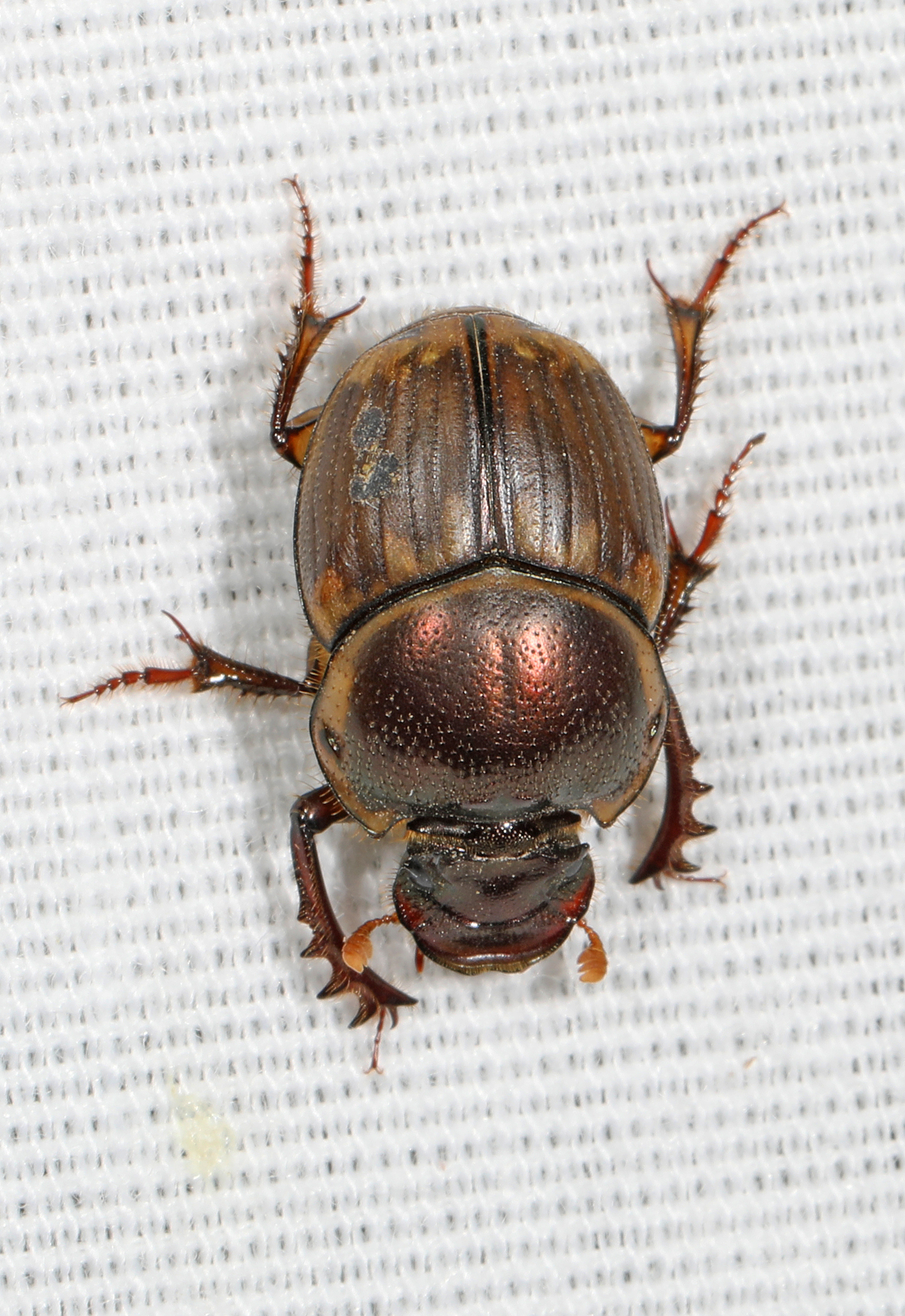
Digitonthophagus gazella, Gazella Dung Beetle, Texas

Digitonthophagus is a genus of Scarabaeidae or scarab beetles in the superfamily Scarabaeoidea. It was considered a subgenus of Onthophagus by some authorities. A review of the taxon was published in 2017.

== Species ==
These 16 species belong to the genus Digitonthophagus:

- Digitonthophagus aksumensis Génier, 2017
- Digitonthophagus biflagellatus Génier, 2017
- Digitonthophagus bonasus (Fabricius, 1775)
- Digitonthophagus catta (Fabricius, 1787)
- Digitonthophagus dilatatus Génier, 2017
- Digitonthophagus eucatta Génier, 2017
- Digitonthophagus falciger Génier, 2017
- Digitonthophagus fimator Génier, 2017
- Digitonthophagus gazella (Fabricius, 1787)
- Digitonthophagus lusinganus (Orbigny, 1905)
- Digitonthophagus namaquensis Génier, 2017
- Digitonthophagus petilus Génier, 2017
- Digitonthophagus sahelicus Moretto, 2017
- Digitonthophagus uks Génier, 2017
- Digitonthophagus ulcerosus Génier, 2017
- Digitonthophagus viridicollis Génier, 2017
