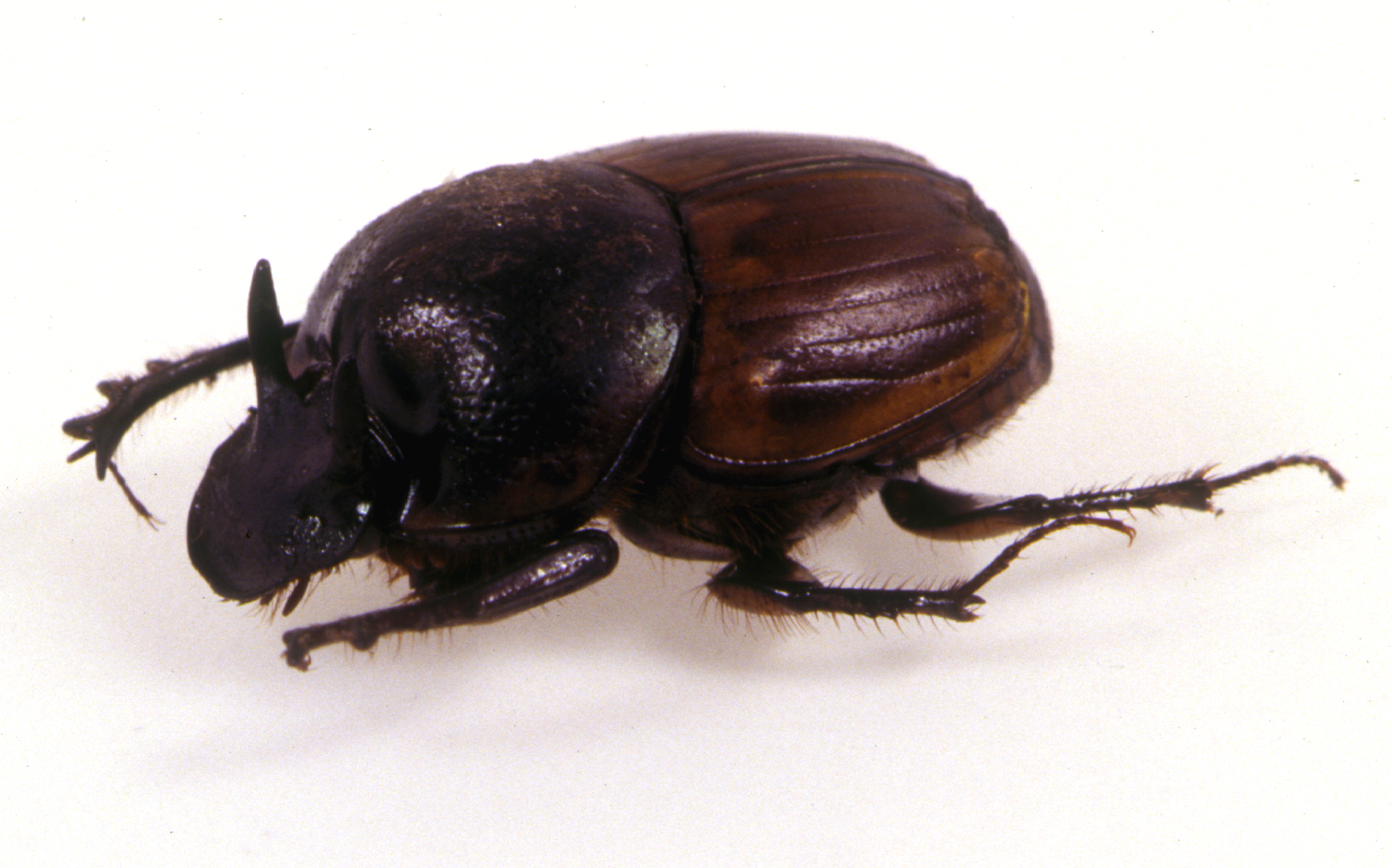
- Male
- Mounted

Scientific classification
- Kingdom: Animalia
- Phylum: Arthropoda
- Clade: Pancrustacea
- Class: Insecta
- Order: Coleoptera
- Suborder: Polyphaga
- Infraorder: Scarabaeiformia
- Family: Scarabaeidae
- Subfamily: Scarabaeinae
- Tribe: Onthophagini
- Genus: Digitonthophagus
- Species: D. gazella

Binomial name
- Digitonthophagus gazella (Fabricius, 1787)

Synonyms
- Scarabaeus gazella Fabricius, 1787; Onthophagus gazella (superseded) (Fabricius, 1787); Onthophagus intermedius Reiche, 1840; Copris antilope Fabricius, 1798; Copris metallicus Fabricius, 1798; Scarabaeus dorcas Olivier, 1789

= Digitonthophagus gazella =

Species of beetle

Digitonthophagus gazella (common names: gazella scarab, brown dung beetle) is a species of scarab beetle. It belongs to the genus Digitonthophagus, which was promoted from subgenus to genus level in 1959. There has been some confusion regarding the application of the names with many people using the outdated name Onthophagus gazella. Dung beetle experts use the term Digitonthophagus gazella.

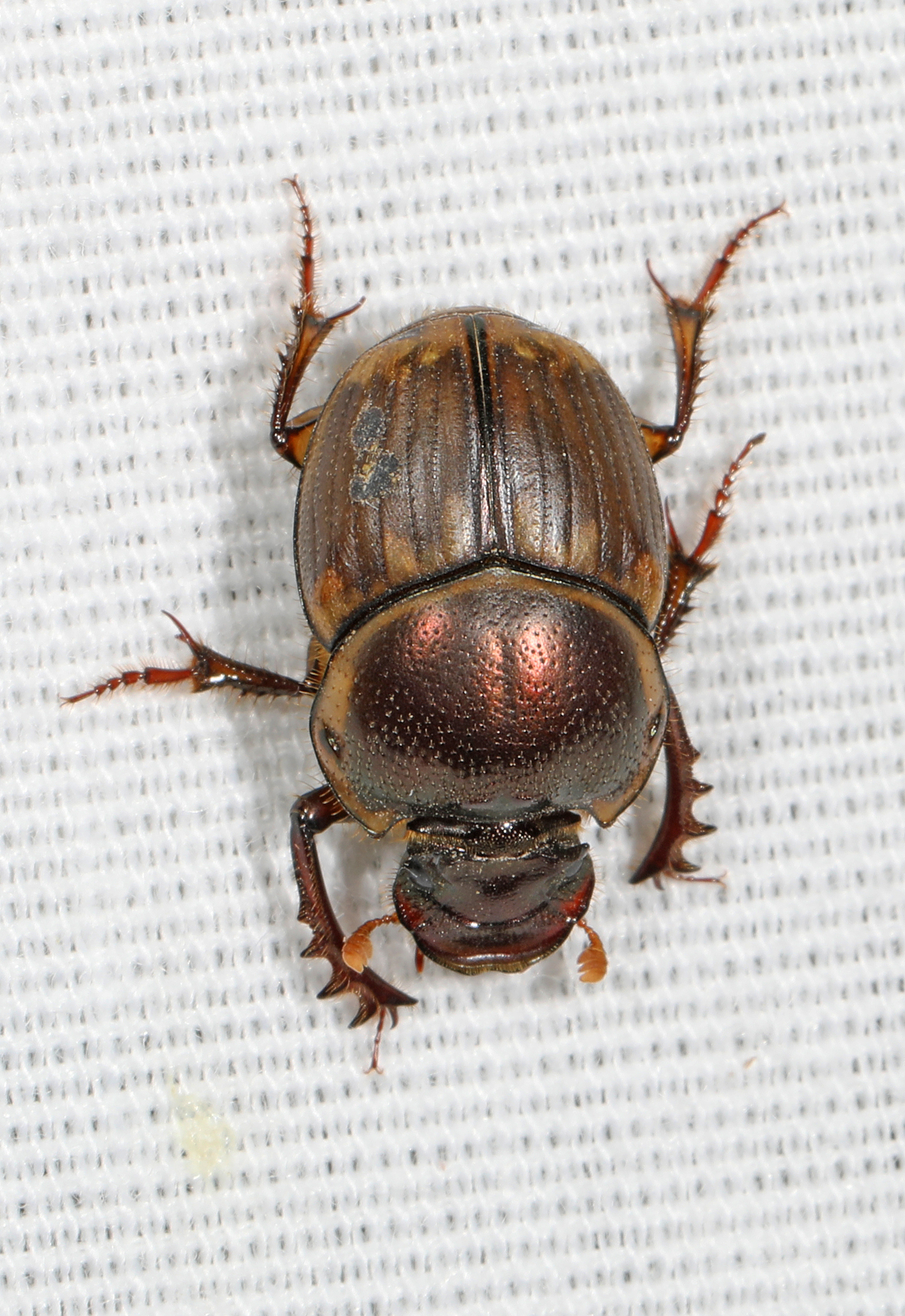
Digitonthophagus gazella, gazelle scarab, Texas

Its native distribution is Afro-Asian. It has been introduced to many other parts of the world in order to help remove cattle dung from pastures, with some introductions leading to naturalized populations. Digitonthophagus gazella was introduced into Australia as part of the Australian Dung Beetle project in 1968.
