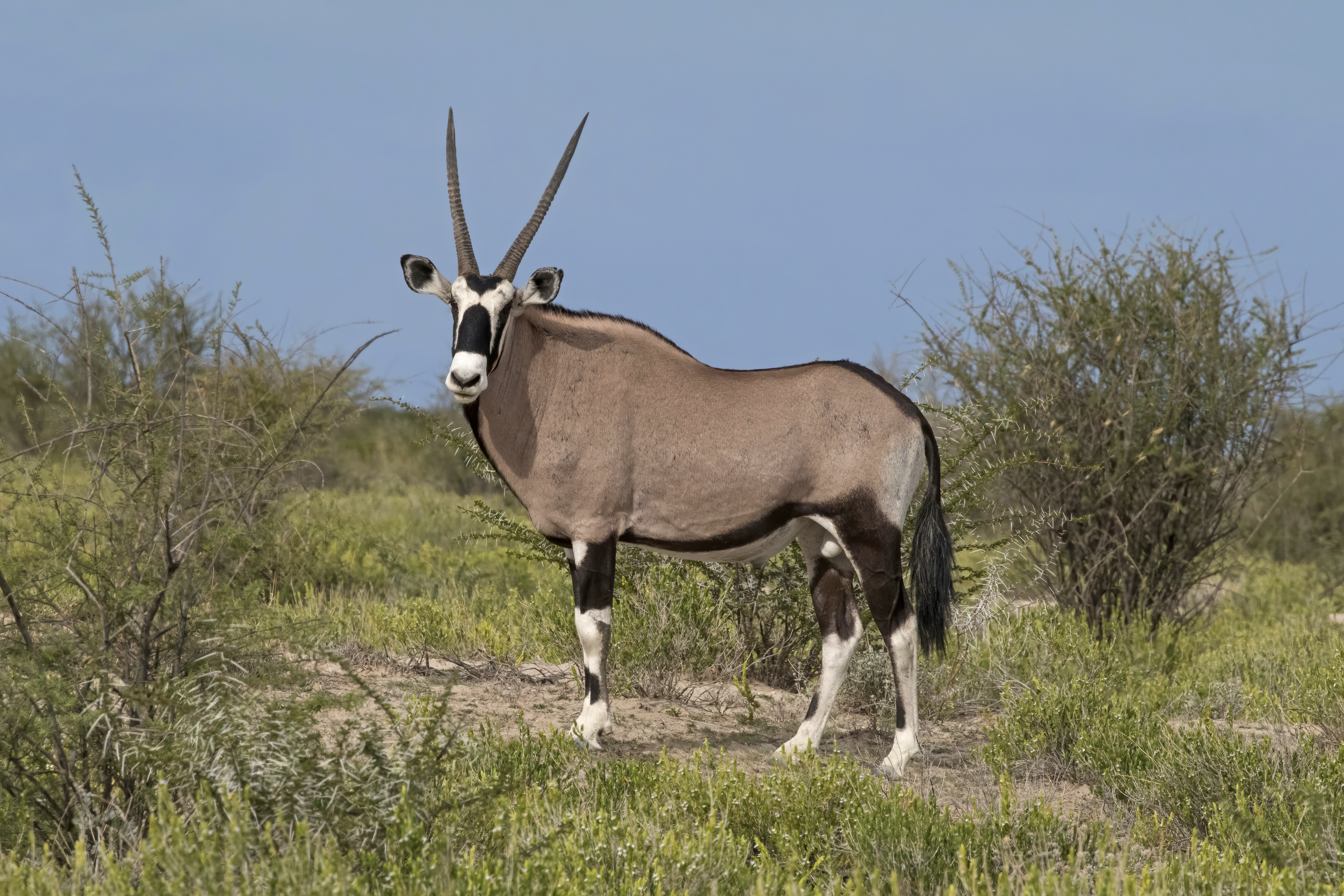
- Male gemsbok in Etosha National Park, Namibia
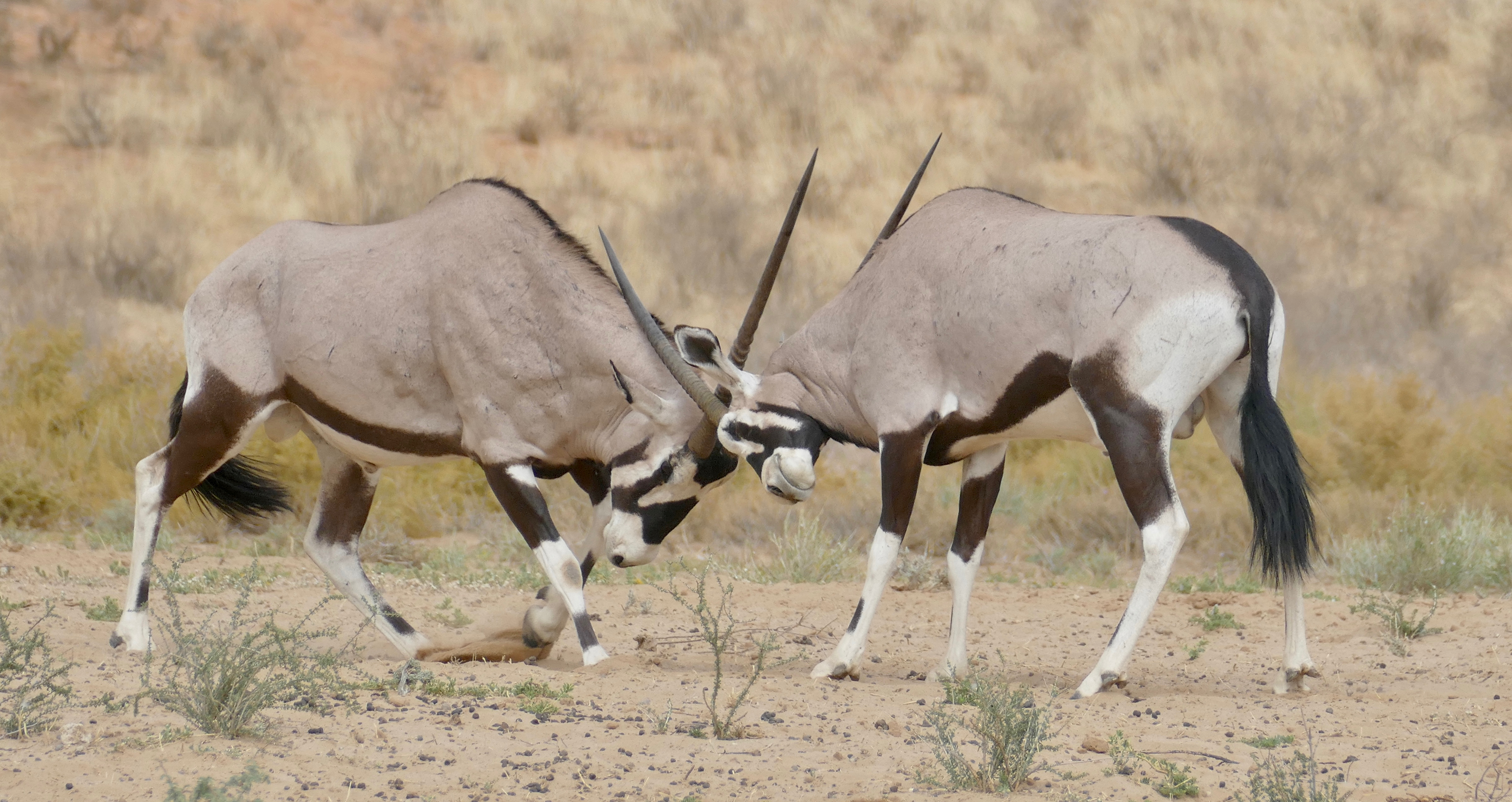
- Gemsboks mock fighting in Kgalagadi Transfrontier Park, South Africa

Conservation status
- Least Concern (IUCN 3.1)

- Apparently Secure (NatureServe)

Scientific classification
- Kingdom: Animalia
- Phylum: Chordata
- Class: Mammalia
- Order: Artiodactyla
- Family: Bovidae
- Subfamily: Hippotraginae
- Genus: Oryx
- Species: O. gazella

Binomial name
- Oryx gazella (Linnaeus, 1758)
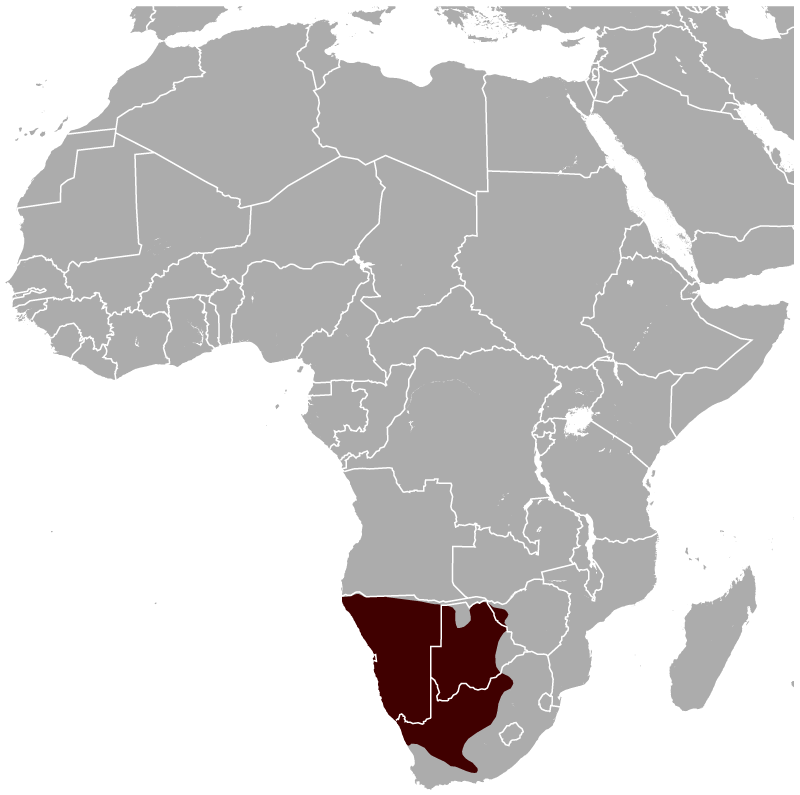
- native range

Synonyms
- Capra gazella Linnaeus, 1758

= Gemsbok =

Species of mammal

The gemsbok (Oryx gazella) is a large antelope in the genus Oryx. It is endemic to the dry and barren regions of Botswana, Namibia, South Africa and (parts of) Zimbabwe, mainly inhabiting the Kalahari and Namib Deserts, areas in which it is supremely adapted for survival. Previously, some sources classified the related East African oryx, or beisa oryx (Oryx beisa), as a subspecies.

== Name ==
The name gemsbok is from Afrikaans, which itself is from the Dutch word of the same spelling, meaning "male chamois", composed of gems ("chamois") + bok ("buck, male goat"). The Dutch gems is further from German Gämse ("chamois"). Although some superficial similarities in appearance (especially in the facial pattern) are noticed, the chamois and the oryx are not closely related. The usual pronunciation in English is /ˈɡɛmzbɒk/.

== Description ==
Gemsbok are light taupe to tan in color, with lighter patches toward the bottom rear of the rump. Their tails are long and black in color. A blackish stripe extends from the chin down the lower edge of the neck, through the juncture of the shoulder and leg along the lower flank of each side to the blackish section of the rear leg. They have muscular necks and shoulders, and their legs have white 'socks' with a black patch on the front of both the front legs, and both sexes have long, straight horns. Comparably, the East African oryx lacks a dark patch at the base of the tail, has less black on the legs (none on the hindlegs), and less black on the lower flanks. One very rare color morph is the "golden oryx", in which the gemsbok's black markings are muted and appear to be golden.

Gemsbok are the largest species in the genus Oryx. They stand about 1.2 m (4 ft) at the shoulder. The body length can vary from 1.9 to 2.4 m (6 ft 3 in to 7 ft 10 in) and the tail measures 45 to 90 cm (18 to 35 in). Male gemsbok can weigh between 180 and 240 kg (400 and 530 lb), while females weigh 100–210 kg (220–460 lb).

== Genomics ==
A near chromosome-scale genome assembly of Oryx gazella was published in 2019. The genome size is approximately 2.9 Gb, with 47 predicted chromosome fragments assembled. The assembly contained 93.8% of expected genes according to BUSCO analysis, and 23,125 protein-coding genes were annotated. This was reported as the first high-quality chromosome-scale genome assembly for the gemsbok.

=== Horns ===
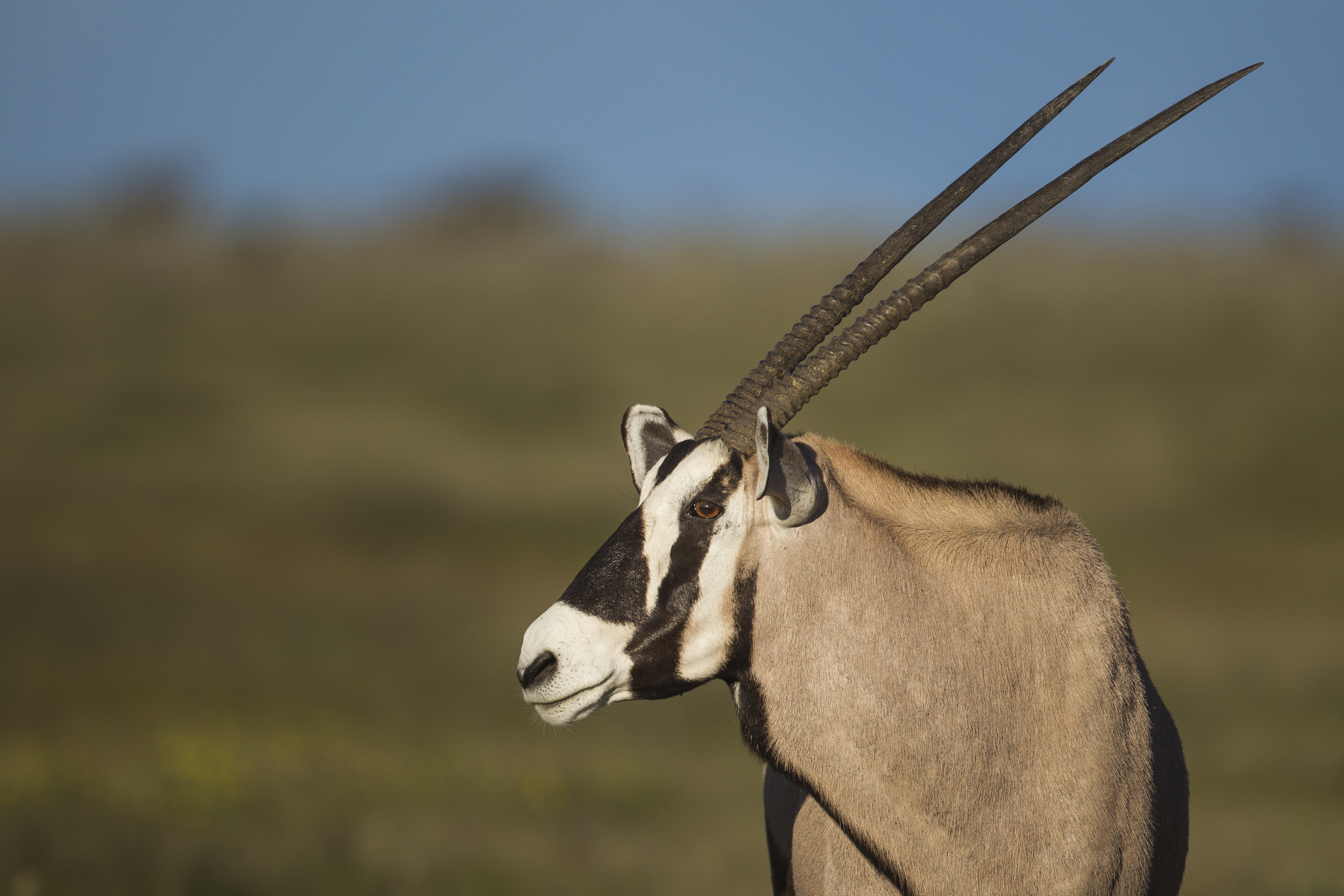
Portrait in Etosha National Park, Namibia

Gemsbok are widely hunted for their spectacular horns that average 85 cm (33 in) in length. From a distance, the only outward difference between males and females is their horns, and many hunters mistake females for males each year. In males, horns tend to be thicker with larger bases; females have slightly longer, thinner horns.

Female gemsbok use their horns to defend themselves and their offspring from predators, while males primarily use their horns to defend their territories from other males.

Gemsbok are one of the few antelope species where female trophies are sometimes more desirable than male ones. A gemsbok horn can be fashioned into a natural trumpet and, according to some authorities, can be used as a shofar.

== Distribution and habitat ==
Gemsbok are found in arid and semi-arid bushlands in southwestern Africa, especially around the Namib and Kalahari deserts, in Botswana, Zimbabwe, Namibia, South Africa and formerly Angola (where they are considered extirpated).

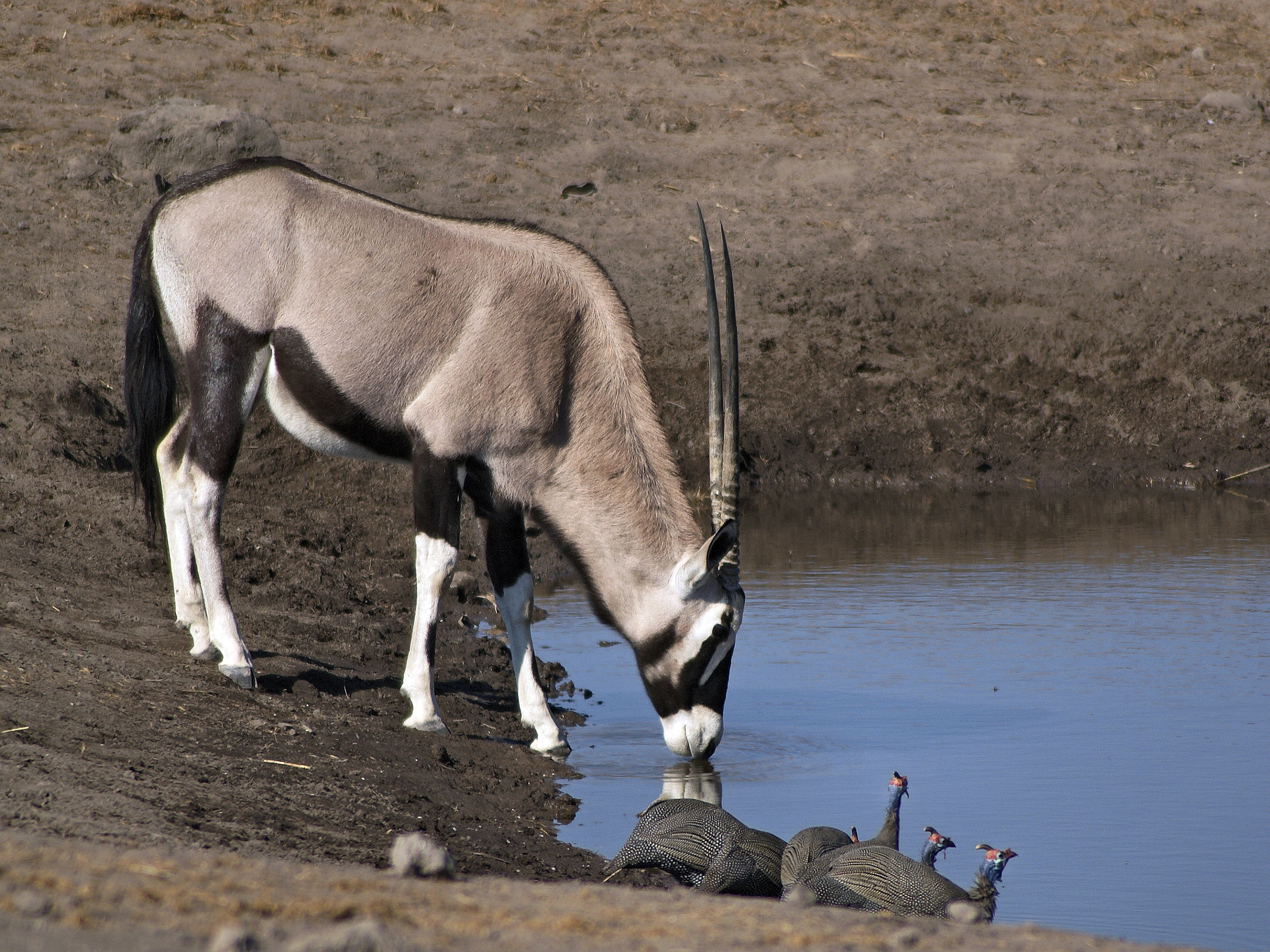
Drinking with a group of helmeted guineafowl in the foreground

A sizeable introduced population of several thousand is also present in the Chihuahuan Desert in Southern New Mexico at the White Sands Missile Range where they are problematic for the local ecosystem.

== Ecology and biology ==
Gemsbok live in herds of about 10–40 animals, which consist of a dominant male, a few nondominant males, and females. They are mainly desert-dwelling and do not depend on drinking water to supply their physiological needs. They can reach running speeds of up to 60 km/h (37 mph). Gemsbok are mostly crepuscular in nature, since temperatures are tolerable and predator detection rates are highest during these times.

=== Diet ===
The gemsbok is generally a grazer but changes to browsing during the dry season or when grass is sparse. It may dig up to a meter deep to find roots and tubers, supplementing its water intake by eating wild tsamma melons and cucumbers, which can provide all the water required (3 liters per 100 kg bodyweight a day).

=== Reproduction ===
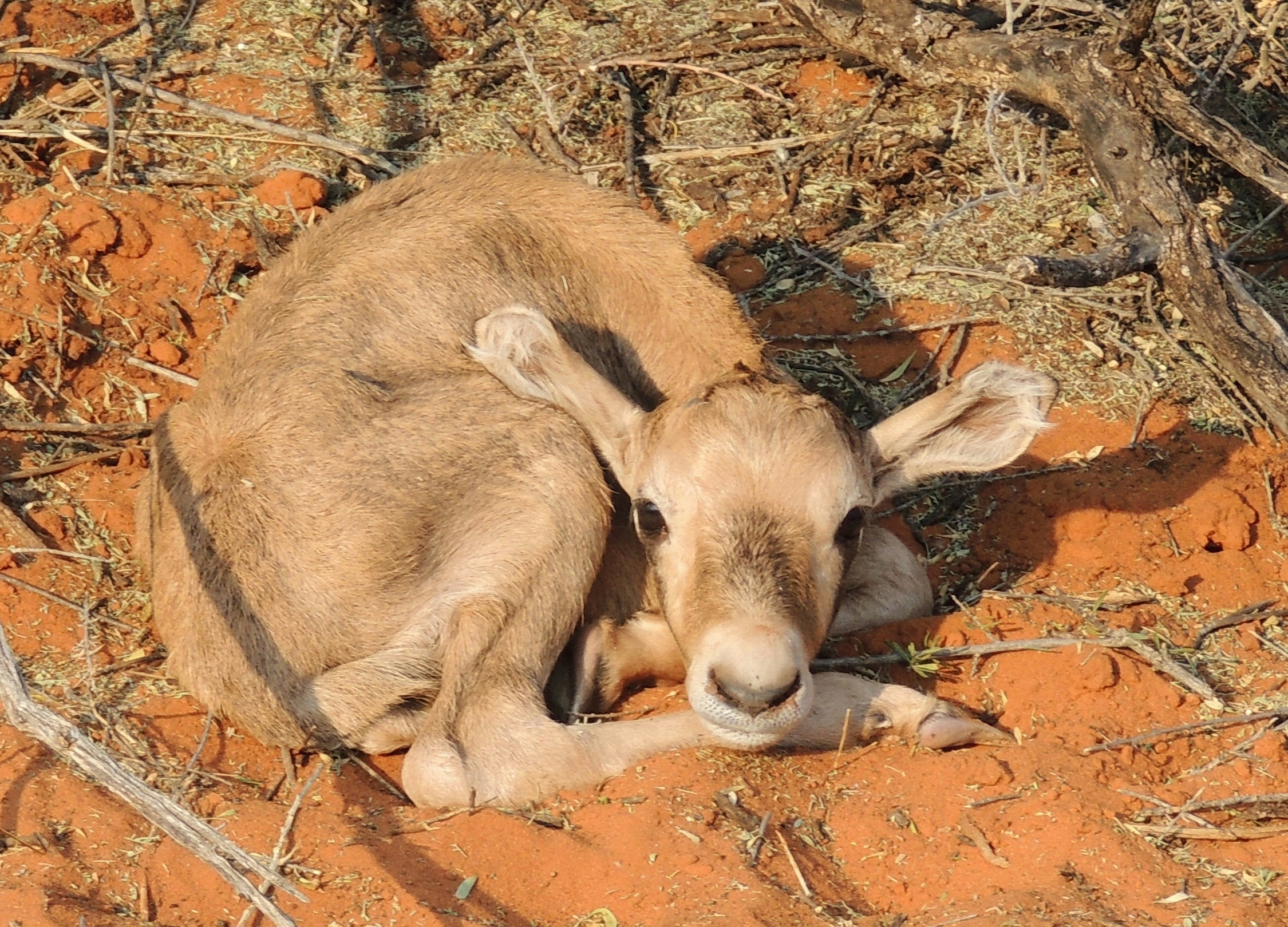
Three-day-old fawn in Namibia

The gemsbok is polygynous, with one resident male mating with the receptive females in the herd. The male is known to secure exclusive mating access to the females by attempting to herd mixed or nursery herds onto his territory. The gemsbok has no specified breeding season, but the young in a given herd tend to be of a similar age due to reproductive synchrony between females. Pregnant females leave the herd before giving birth. The gestation period lasts 270 days (9 months) and mothers give birth to 1–2 offspring. The calf remains hidden 6 weeks after birth, after which mother and calf rejoin the herd. The calf is weaned at 3 1/2 months, becomes independent at 4 1/2 months, and achieves sexual maturity at 1 1/2–2 years in both sexes.

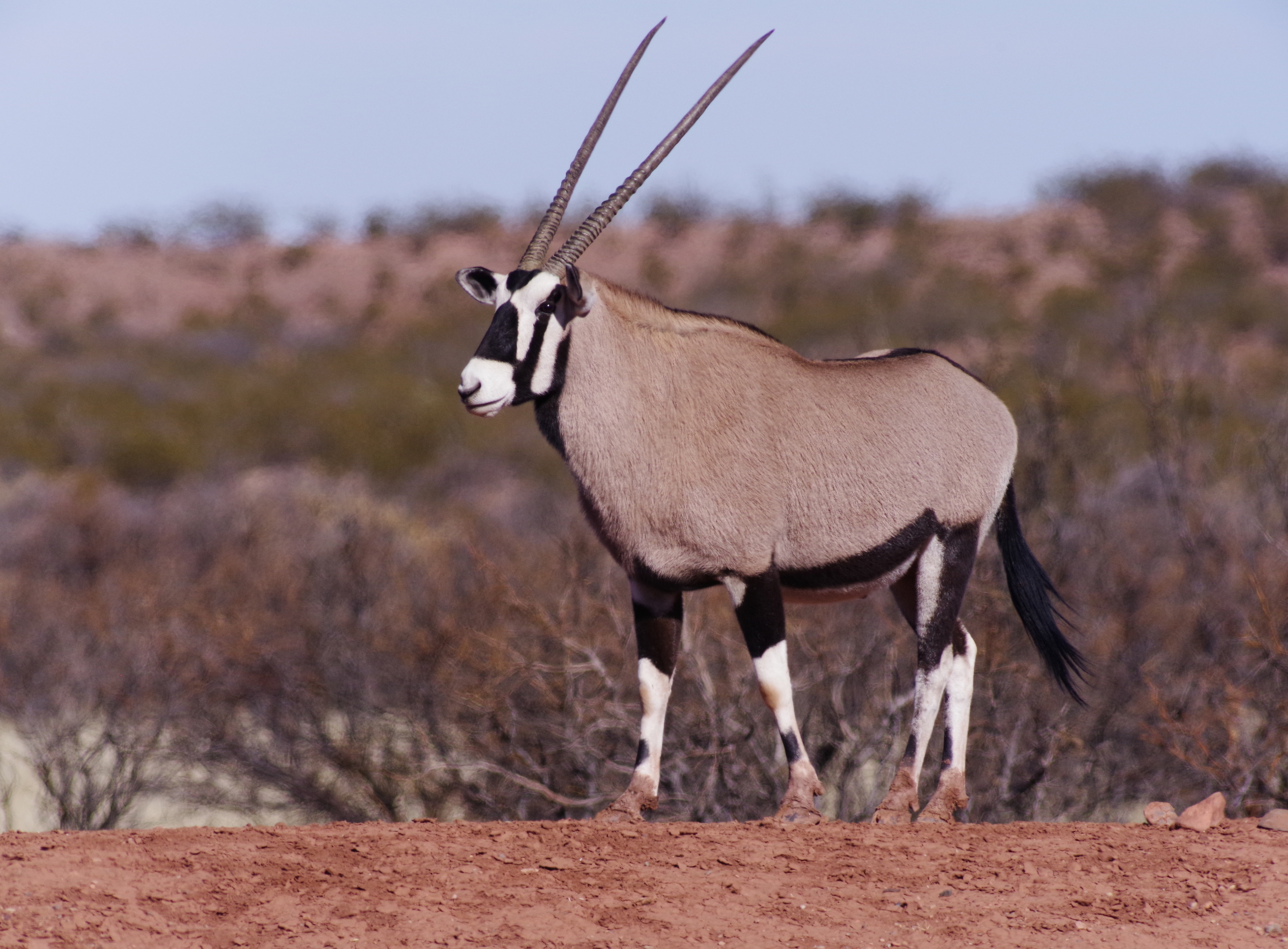
Buck on the Jornada del Muerto trail north of Upham, New Mexico, USA

== Introduction to North America ==
In 1969, the New Mexico State Department of Game and Fish decided to introduce gemsbok to the Tularosa Basin, New Mexico, in the United States. Ninety-three were released from 1969 to 1977, with the current population estimated to be around 3,000 individuals. Gradually expanding their range from Tularosa Basin towards the west and northwest, an unknown number of animals are now also established in the San Andres National Wildlife Refuge, the Fra Cristobal Range, and the Jornada Biosphere Reserve as well as the endorheic drainage basins east of Caballo Mountains, especially where these are traversed by the Jornada del Muerto trail north of Upham.

=== Potential invasive status ===
The inherent biology of gemsbok makes them a potential invasive species in New Mexico. As they are capable of year-round breeding, the transplanted population thrives in the absence of their natural predators, such as the lion (Panthera leo), spotted hyena (Crocuta crocuta), cheetah (Acinonyx jubatus) and leopard (Panthera pardus). Except for calves, the oryx is too large to be preyed on by the coyote (Canis latrans) and most other major American desert carnivores, since the jaguar (Panthera onca) is mostly extirpated from the state, and the reintroduced Mexican wolf (Canis lupus baileyi) is too low in population numbers (and all known Mexican wolf populations are over 100 miles away). The species is therefore primarily managed by regulated hunting. However, the only North American predator that regularly takes gemsbok is the cougar (Puma concolor); for only one individual, 29 gemsbok were hunted, with the species making up 58% of recorded kills (most consisting of newborns, but some adults were also known to have been killed).

Additionally, New Mexico gemsbok seem to prefer undisturbed grasslands for feeding, putting pressure on grassland ecosystems already threatened by climate change and encroachment by shrubs. This fact, along with their larger size and potentially dangerous horns, may cause them to outcompete with and/or put pressure on not only local livestock operations, but native desert herbivores, such as the pronghorn (Antilocapra americana) and the mule deer (Odocoileus hemionus). In addition, gemsbok may spread disease to fellow bovids like the desert bighorn sheep (Ovis canadensis nelsoni).

== Significance to humans ==
The gemsbok is depicted on the coat of arms of Namibia, where the current population of the species is estimated at 373,000 individuals. In the town of Oranjemund, resident gemsbok wander freely around the streets, taking advantage of the vegetation in the town, such as the grass in parks, road medians, and browsing on low branches of the many trees.
