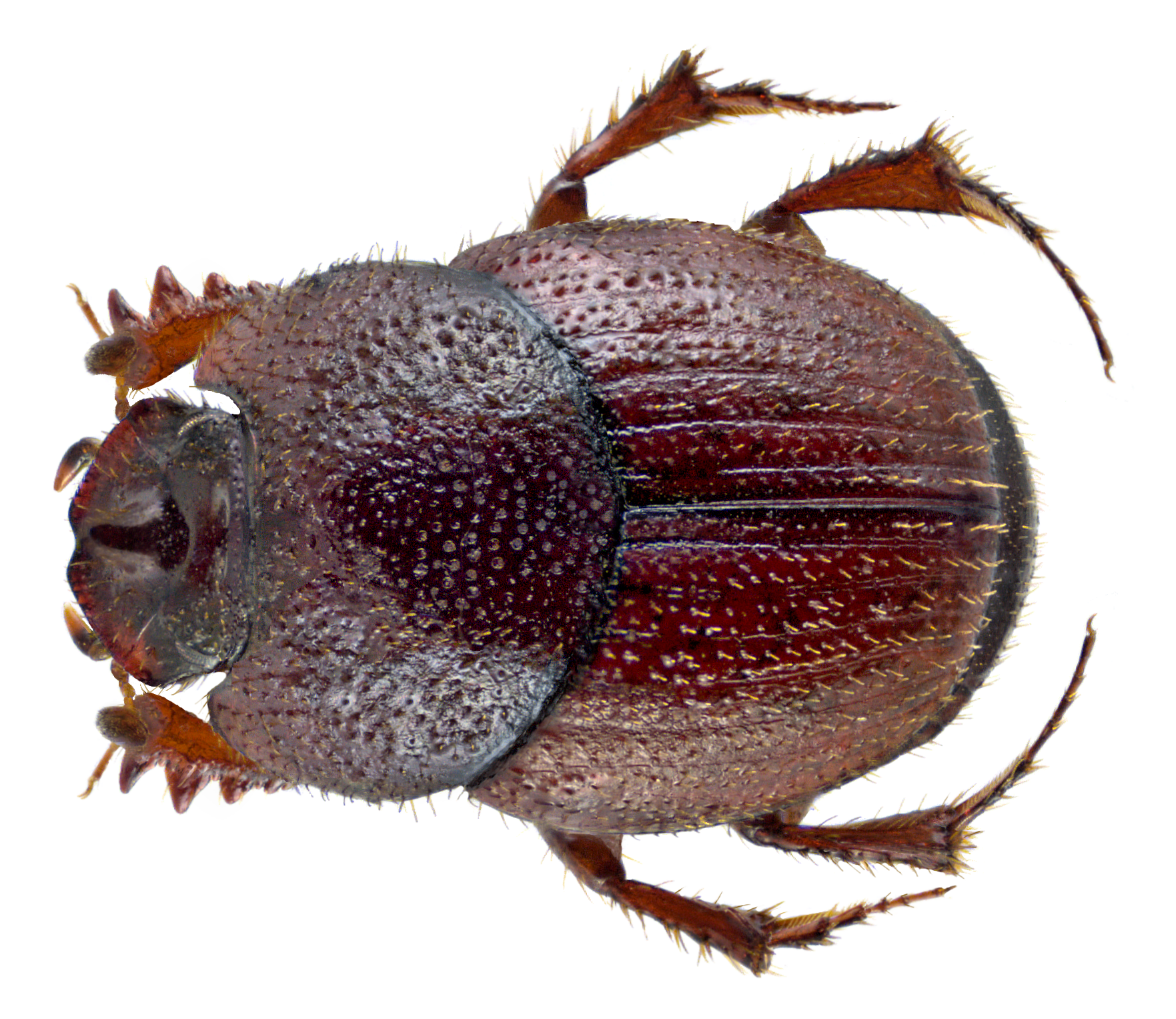

Scientific classification
- Kingdom: Animalia
- Phylum: Arthropoda
- Clade: Pancrustacea
- Class: Insecta
- Order: Coleoptera
- Suborder: Polyphaga
- Infraorder: Scarabaeiformia
- Family: Scarabaeidae
- Genus: Caccobius
- Species: C. unicornis

Binomial name
- Caccobius unicornis (Fabricius, 1798)

Synonyms
- Copris unicornis Fabricius, 1798; Caccobius yamauchii Matsumura, 1936; Onthophagus nitidiceps Fairmaire, 1893; Onthophagus unicornis Boucomont, 1914

= Caccobius unicornis =

Species of beetle

Caccobius unicornis, is a species of dung beetle found in many Asian and South East Asian countries such as: India, Sri Lanka, China, Java, Borneo, Taiwan, Korea, Japan, Myanmar, North Vietnam, Philippines, Sumatra, Java, Borneo, Malaysia, Thailand, and Indochina.

== Description ==
This small, broadly oval and compact beetle has an average length of about 3 to 3.5 mm. Body black or pitchy. Clypeus, elytra, and legs are dark red in color. Antenna and mouthparts yellowish where the upper and lower surfaces with minute pale setae. Head short and broad, with slightly bilobed clypeus in front and rounded at the sides. Pronotum strongly punctured. Elytra are finely striate. Pygidium finely punctured. Legs are short, and the hind tibia broad at the extremity. Male has shiny head with few scattered punctures. Male also bears a short, erect horn with a slight depression behind it. Female head consists with large and small punctures.

It is commonly observed in the intestines of small children that cause the condition called scarabiasis.
