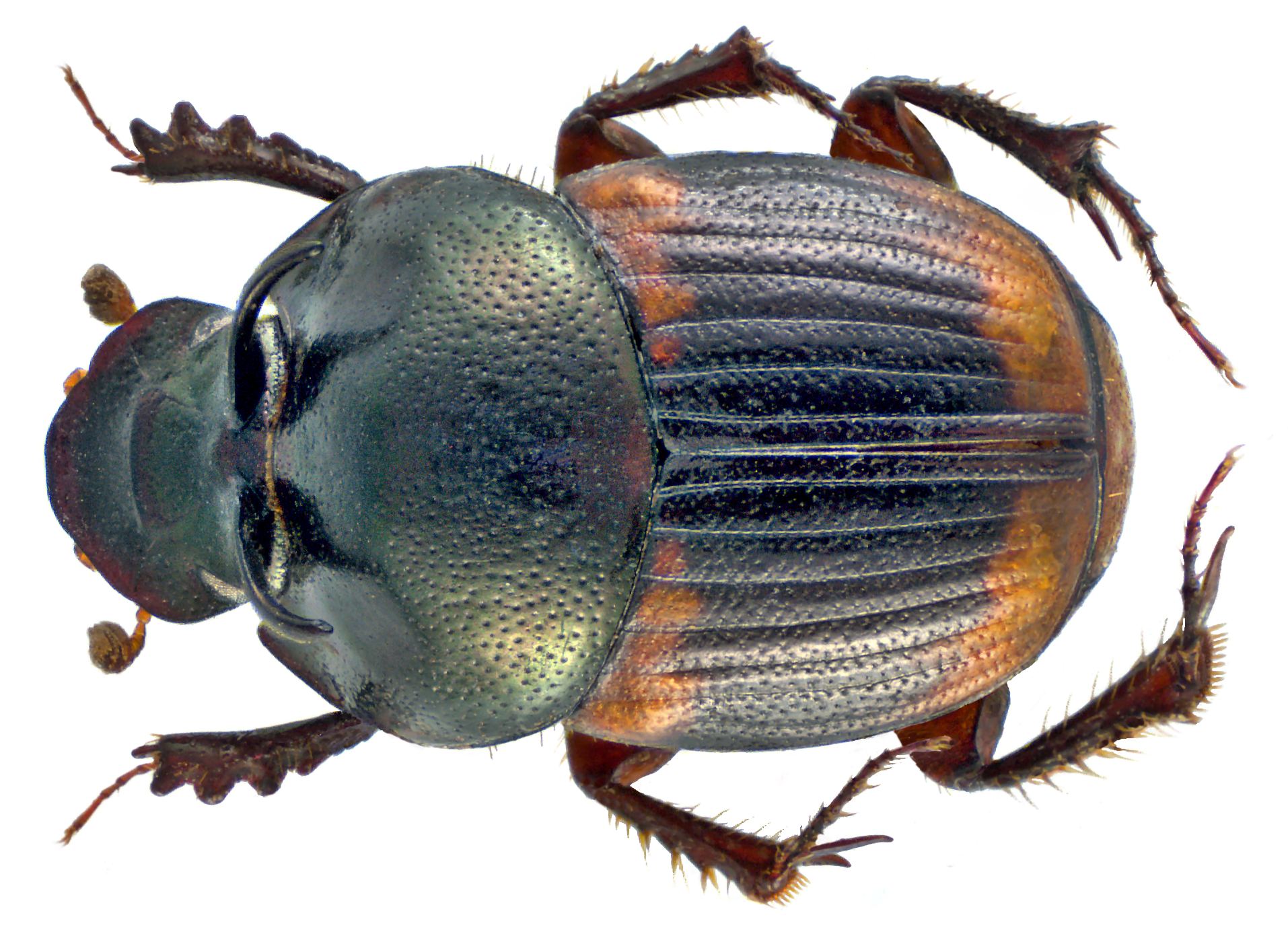

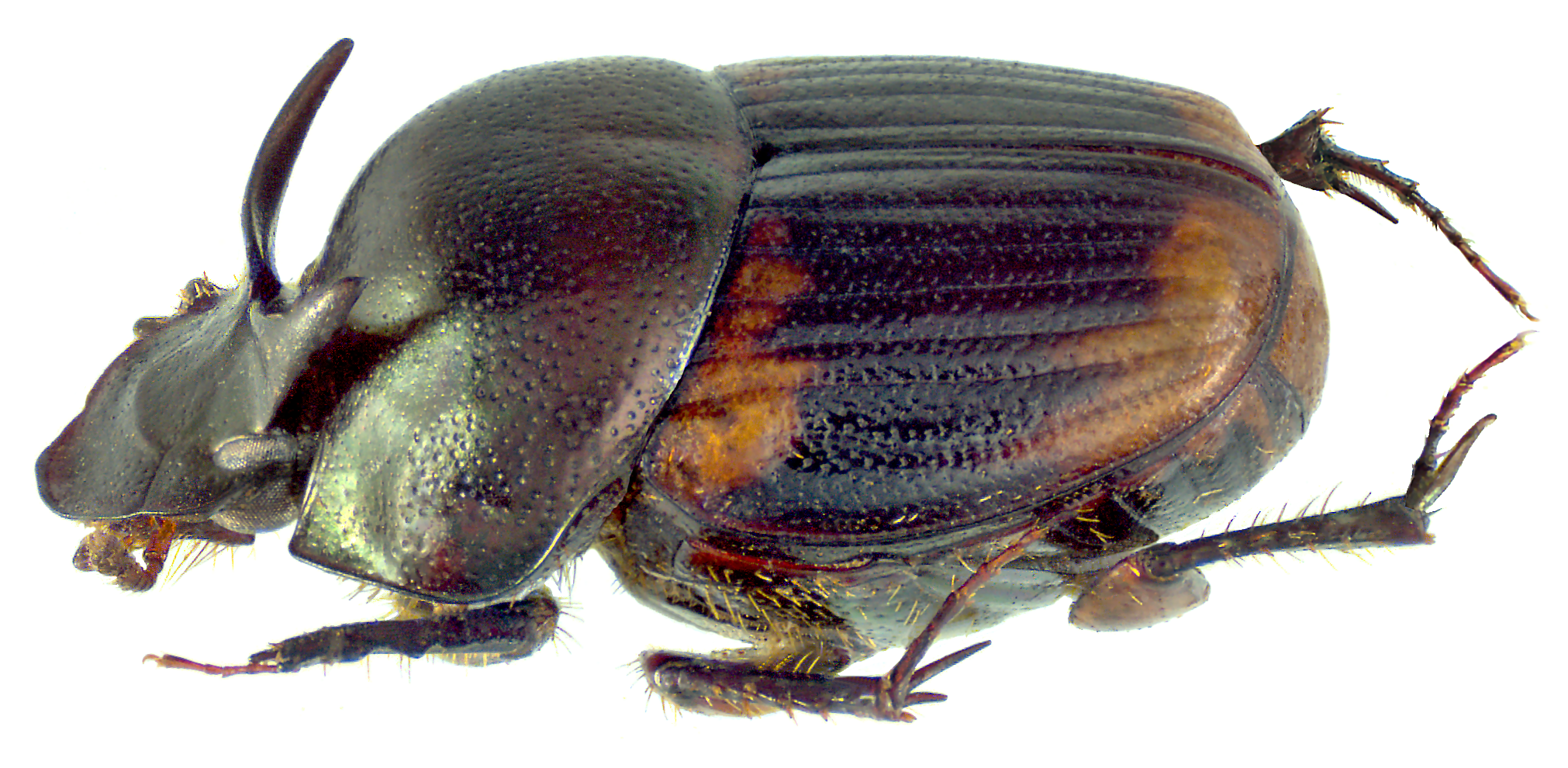

Scientific classification
- Kingdom: Animalia
- Phylum: Arthropoda
- Clade: Pancrustacea
- Class: Insecta
- Order: Coleoptera
- Suborder: Polyphaga
- Infraorder: Scarabaeiformia
- Family: Scarabaeidae
- Genus: Onthophagus
- Species: O. cervus

Binomial name
- Onthophagus cervus (Fabricius, 1798)

Synonyms
- Copris cervus Fabricius, 1798

= Onthophagus cervus =

Species of beetle

Onthophagus cervus, is a species of dung beetle found in Pakistan, Saudi Arabia, Sri Lanka, Vietnam, India, Andaman and Nicobar Islands and Thailand.

== Description ==
This oval, moderately convex species has an average length of about 6 to 7 mm. Male is smaller than female. Body black and shiny. Head, pronotum, elytra and ventrum are coppery or green. Elytra covered with orange clothing. Sometimes only irregular humeral and apical spots are present. Femora, antennae, mouthparts, pygidium, and abdominal sides are yellowish, whereas dorsum is thinly clothed with minute yellow setae. Head less broad, with rounded ocular. Clypeus little produced with strongly reflexed angle. Pronotum fairly strongly, unevenly punctured. Elytra finely striate, with slightly convex intervals. Pygidium punctured intermixed with both large and small punctures. Metasternal shield with very few fine punctures. Male has little produced, truncate and very shiny clypeus. A pair of horns located behind the eyes, which are sloping backward. Pronotum rather flat, smooth, and shiny. Female has strongly and closely punctured clypeus without shine.

Adults are known to spread scarabiasis, a condition of presence of beetles in the intestine of humans.
