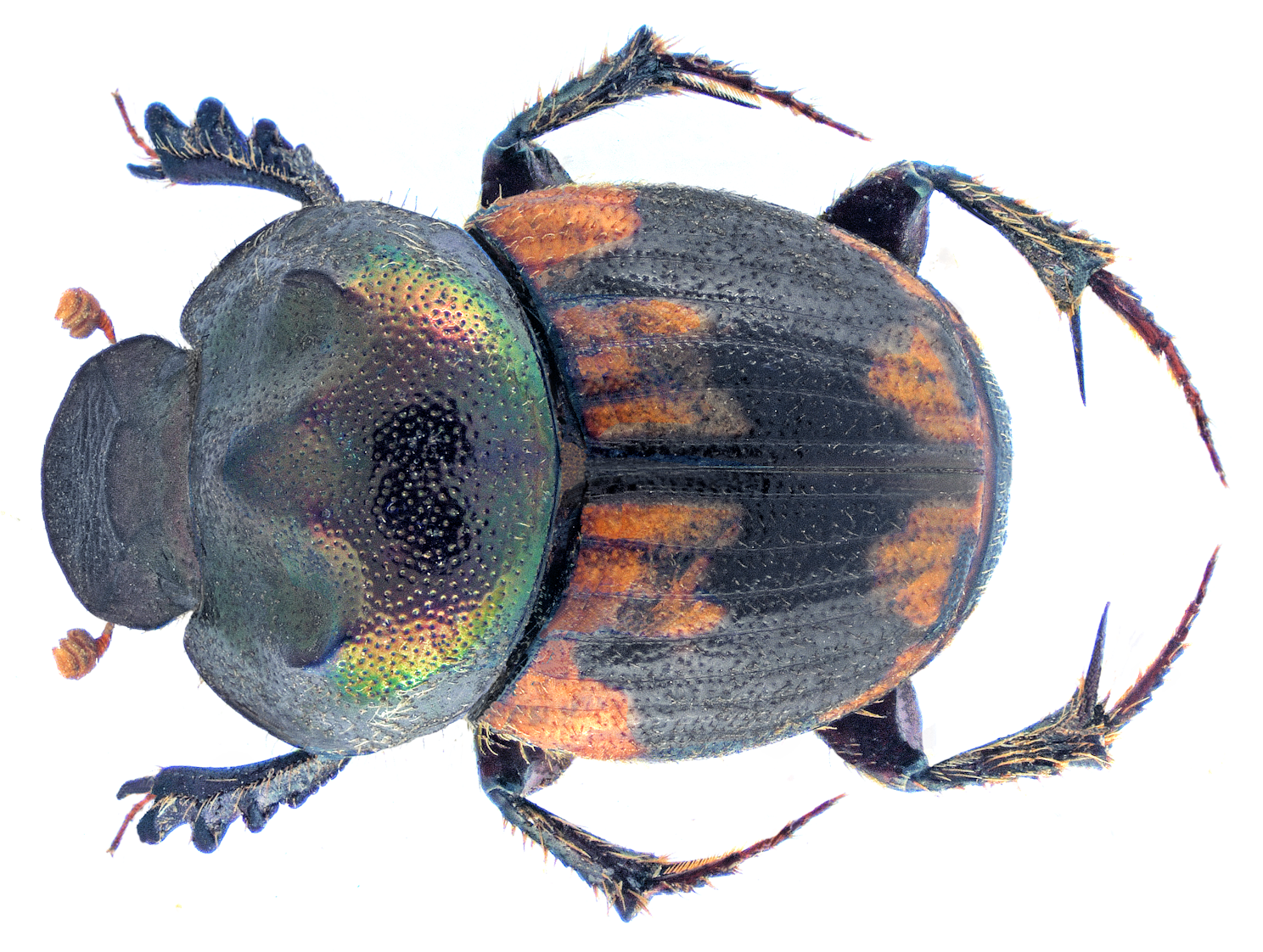

Scientific classification
- Kingdom: Animalia
- Phylum: Arthropoda
- Clade: Pancrustacea
- Class: Insecta
- Order: Coleoptera
- Suborder: Polyphaga
- Infraorder: Scarabaeiformia
- Family: Scarabaeidae
- Genus: Onthophagus
- Species: O. unifasciatus

Binomial name
- Onthophagus unifasciatus (Schaller, 1783)

Synonyms
- Scarabaeus unifasciatus Schaller, 1783; Scarabaeus unifasciatus Fabricius, 1792; Onthophagus prolixus Walker, 1858; Onthophagus unifasciatus Arrow, 1931

= Onthophagus unifasciatus =

Species of beetle

Onthophagus unifasciatus, is a species of true dung beetle native to India and Sri Lanka.

== Description ==
Average length is about 6 to 9 mm. Body is short, compact and shining. Dorsum coppery green or dark blue in color. Elytra bright yellow, and decorated with a broad irregular black median band. There is a spot upon the 5th interval close to the base, as well as a transverse spot linking the apical margin. Pronotum strongly punctured which is obliquely retuse in front.

The species is identified as a cause for the disease Scarabiasis, where specimens were collected from human faeces. There were many reports of children mainly between the ages of 1 and 5 years passing live beetles with their faeces in Sri Lanka.
