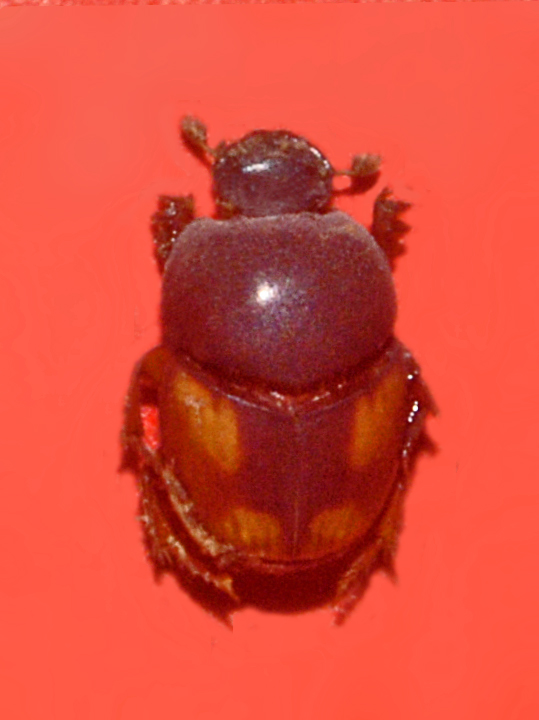
- Caccobius schreberi museum specimen

Scientific classification
- Kingdom: Animalia
- Phylum: Arthropoda
- Class: Insecta
- Order: Coleoptera
- Suborder: Polyphaga
- Infraorder: Scarabaeiformia
- Family: Scarabaeidae
- Genus: Caccobius
- Species: C. schreberi

Binomial name
- Caccobius schreberi (Linnaeus, 1767)

Synonyms
- Caccobius schreiberi (Linnaeus, 1767)

= Caccobius schreberi =

Species of beetle

Caccobius schreberi is a species of Scarabaeidae or scarab beetles in the superfamily Scarabaeoidea.

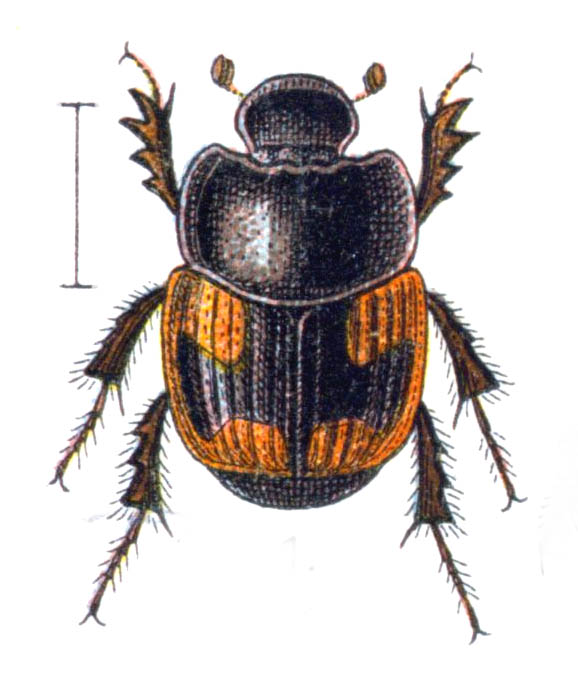
Caccobius schreberi. Illustration from Fauna Germanica (1908)

== Description ==
Caccobius schreberi can reach a length of 4–7 millimetres (0.16–0.28 in). Head and pronotum are black. Pronotum is almost circular, as wide as the elytrae, and densely punctured. Elytrae have distinct black marks and two pairs of reddish spots. The first pair of legs are powerful, with three teeth on the outside and fit to digging.

== Distribution ==
This species is present in most of Europe, in the Middle East and in North Africa. These beetles can be found in dry steppe areas.

== Bibliography ==
- Fiori A. (1903) Caccobius Schreberi Lin. E sue varietà, Rivista coleotterologica italiana. Camerino 1(6):105-109
- Mulsant E. (1842) Histoire naturelle des Coléoptères de France. Lamellicornes, Paris, Lyon :1-623
- Linnaeus C. (1767) Systema naturae per regna tria naturae, secundum classes, ordines, genera, species cum characteribus, differentiis, synonymis, locis. Editio XII, Laurentii Salvi, Holmiae 1:1-1327
- Scarabs: World Scarabaeidae Database. Schoolmeesters P.
