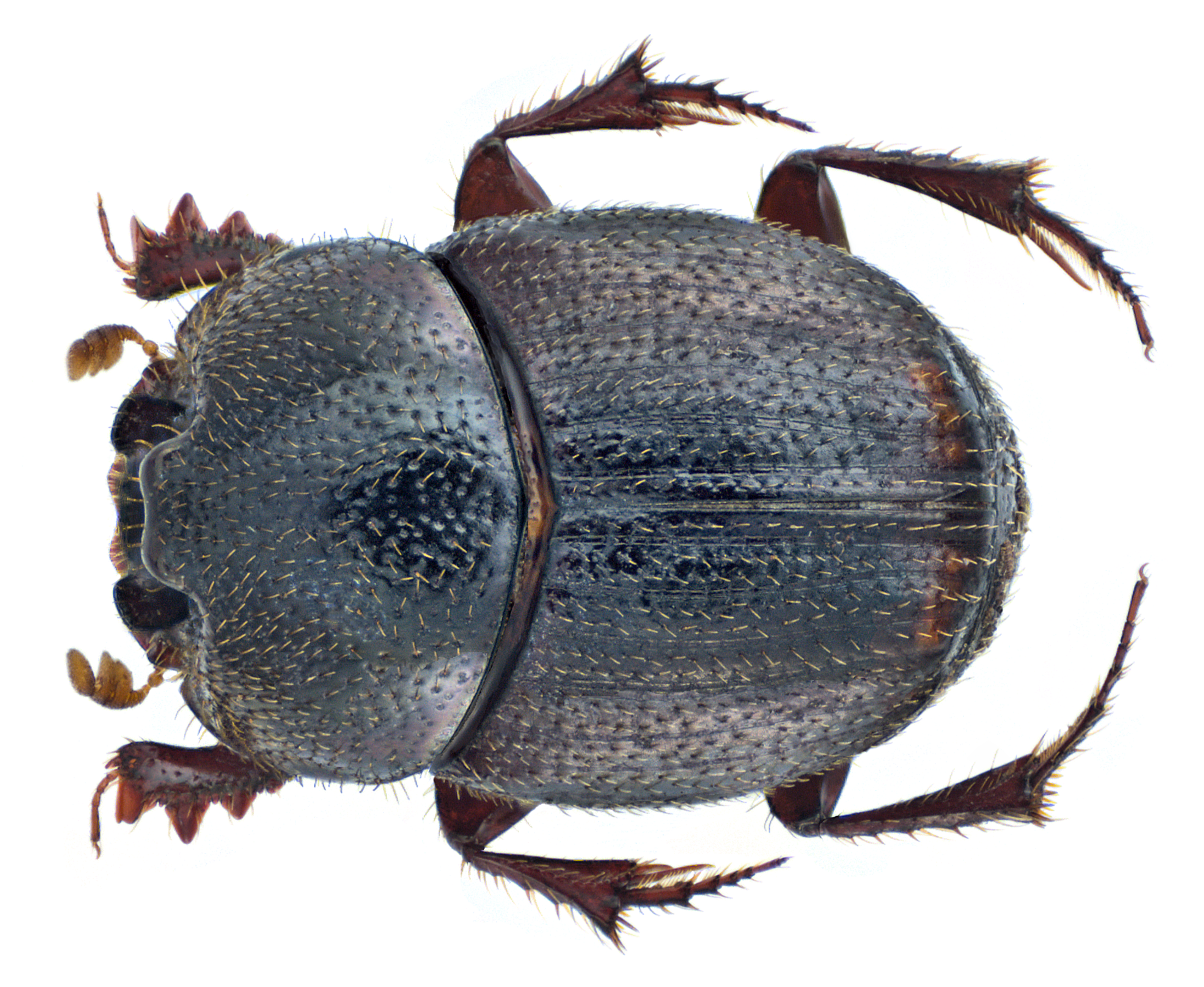

Scientific classification
- Kingdom: Animalia
- Phylum: Arthropoda
- Class: Insecta
- Order: Coleoptera
- Suborder: Polyphaga
- Infraorder: Scarabaeiformia
- Family: Scarabaeidae
- Genus: Caccobius
- Species: C. vulcanus

Binomial name
- Caccobius vulcanus (Fabricius, 1798)

Synonyms
- Copris vulcanus Fabricius, 1801; Caccophilus mutans Sharp, 1875; Copris bicuspis Wiedemann, 1823

= Caccobius vulcanus =

Species of beetle

Caccobius vulcanus, is a species of dung beetle native to India and Sri Lanka.

== Description ==
This small, convex, oval and compact beetle has an average length of about 4 to 5 mm. Body black with shining golden-red head and pronotum. In elytra which is scarcely shining, consists with a short transverse orange to reddish line located at the posterior margin. Head short and broad. Clypeus bilobed and pronotum strongly, evenly, and closely punctured. Pygidium sparsely punctured. Male has very feebly bilobed clypeus and shiny forehead, whereas female has rugose clypeus and sparsely punctured forehead.
