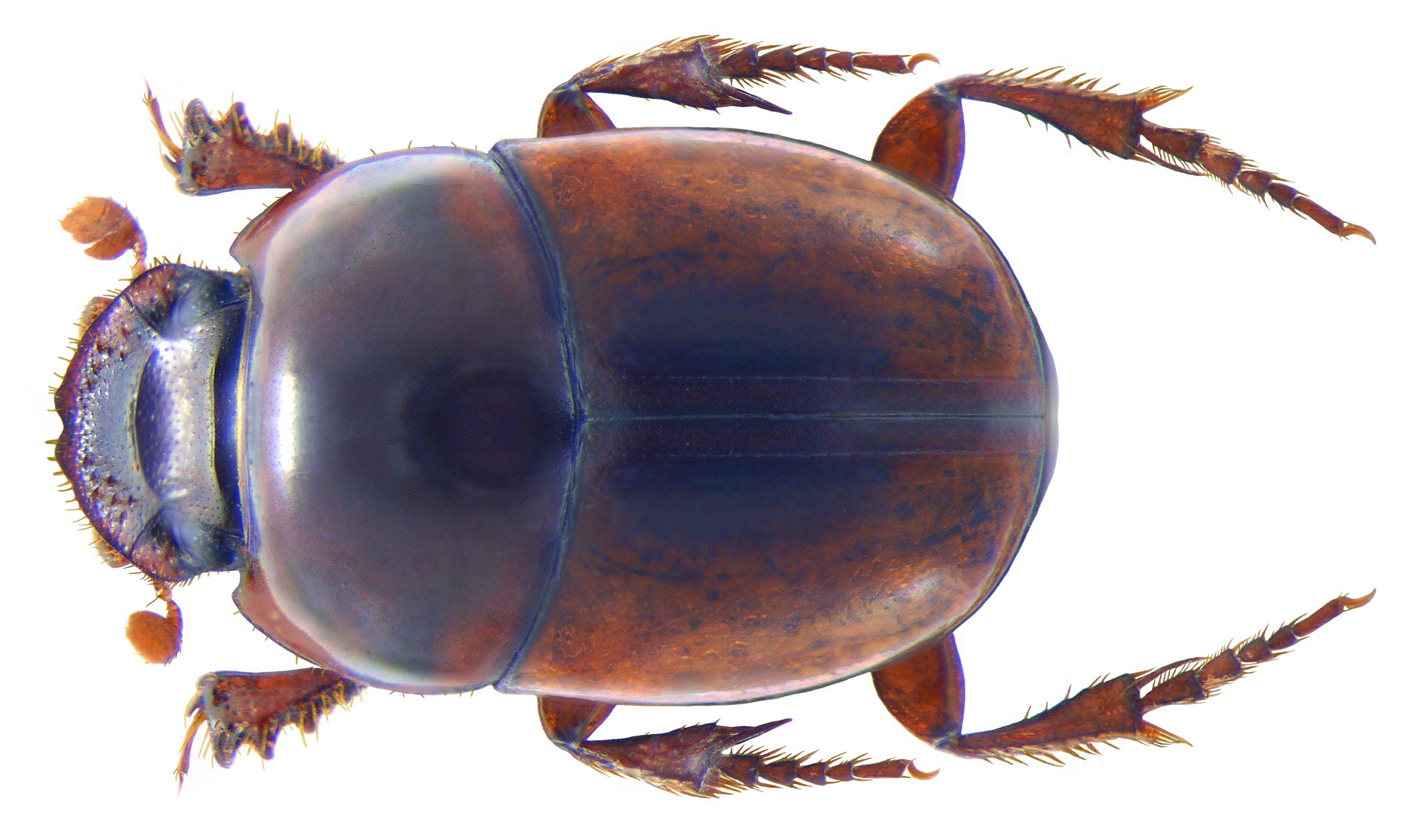
- Caccobius castaneus

Scientific classification
- Kingdom: Animalia
- Phylum: Arthropoda
- Clade: Pancrustacea
- Class: Insecta
- Order: Coleoptera
- Suborder: Polyphaga
- Infraorder: Scarabaeiformia
- Family: Scarabaeidae
- Genus: Caccobius; C.G. Thomson, 1859

= Caccobius (beetle) =

Genus of beetles

Caccobius is a genus of Scarabaeidae or scarab beetles.

== Species ==
Species in this genus include:

- Caccobius anthracites (D'Orbigny, 1904)
- Caccobius aterrimus (Fabricius, 1798)
- Caccobius atratus Walter & Cambefort, 1977
- Caccobius auberti D'Orbigny, 1902
- Caccobius balthasari Tesar, 1969
- Caccobius bama Walter, 2014
- Caccobius bawangensis Ochi, Kon & Kikuta, 1997
- Caccobius bidentatus Boucomont, 1923
- Caccobius binodulus Harold, 1877
- Caccobius boucomonti Balthasar, 1935
- Caccobius brevis Waterhouse, 1875
- Caccobius cabellai Walter, 2019
- Caccobius callosifrons D Orbigny, 1905
- Caccobius castaneus (Klug, 1855)
- Caccobius cavatus D'Orbigny, 1908
- Caccobius christophi Harold, 1879
- Caccobius chujoi Paulian, 1942
- Caccobius corniceps D'Orbigny, 1913
- Caccobius cribrarius Boucomont, 1928
- Caccobius croceocinctus D'Orbigny, 1913
- Caccobius curvicornis Walter & Cambefort, 1977
- Caccobius cuspidiger D'Orbigny, 1913
- Caccobius cyclotis Cambefort, 1984
- Caccobius demangei Boucomont, 1919
- Caccobius denticollis Harold, 1867
- Caccobius devagiriensis Nithya & Sabu, 2013
- Caccobius diminutivus (Walker, 1858)
- Caccobius discrepans (Péringuey, 1901)
- Caccobius dorsalis Harold, 1867
- Caccobius dybowskii D'Orbigny, 1902
- Caccobius elephantinus Balthasar, 1967
- Caccobius excavatus Bai, Zhang & Yang, 2007
- Caccobius ferrugineus (Fahraeus, 1857)
- Caccobius flavolimbatus Balthasar, 1942
- Caccobius foveolatus Frey, 1955
- Caccobius fukiensis Balthasar, 1942
- Caccobius fuliginosus (Roth, 1851)
- Caccobius gallinus (Arrow, 1907)
- Caccobius gananensis D'Orbigny, 1904
- Caccobius genierorum Walter, 2014
- Caccobius gibbosulus D'Orbigny, 1915
- Caccobius gilleti Balthasar, 1933
- Caccobius globaticeps D'Orbigny, 1905
- Caccobius gonoderus (Fairmaire, 1888)
- Caccobius grossegranosus Balthasar, 1963
- Caccobius himalayanus Jekel, 1872
- Caccobius hirsutus Frey, 1958
- Caccobius histerinus (Fahraeus, 1857)
- Caccobius histeroides (Ménetriés, 1832)
- Caccobius histrio Balthasar, 1967
- Caccobius imitans Balthasar, 1932
- Caccobius inconspicuus (Fahraeus, 1857)
- Caccobius indicus Harold, 1867
- Caccobius inops (Péringuey, 1901)
- Caccobius ivorensis Cambefort, 1984
- Caccobius jessoensis Harold, 1867
- Caccobius jossoi Walter, 2014
- Caccobius kelleri (Olsoufieff, 1907)
- Caccobius krikkeni Cambefort, 1980
- Caccobius lateralis D'Orbigny, 1905
- Caccobius leleupi Balthasar, 1963
- Caccobius longipennis D'Orbigny, 1904
- Caccobius maruyamai Masumoto, Ochi & Sakchoowong, 2012
- Caccobius masumotoi Cambefort, 1990
- Caccobius meridionalis Boucomont, 1914
- Caccobius mirabilepunctatus Cambefort, 1971
- Caccobius montreuilli Walter, 2019
- Caccobius morettoi Walter, 2014
- Caccobius mundus (Ménetriés, 1838)
- Caccobius nigritulus (Klug, 1855)
- Caccobius nikkoensis (Lewis, 1895)
- Caccobius obtusus Fåhraeus, 1857
- Caccobius ocellipennis D'Orbigny, 1913
- Caccobius pantherinus Arrow, 1931
- Caccobius pentagonus D'Orbigny, 1908
- Caccobius pilosus Frey, 1958
- Caccobius polygonus D'Orbigny, 1911
- Caccobius postlutatus d’Orbigny, 1905
- Caccobius pseudocorniceps Josso, 2018
- Caccobius pseudolaevis D'Orbigny, 1908
- Caccobius pulicarius Harold, 1875
- Caccobius pullus Jekel, 1872
- Caccobius punctatissimus Harold, 1867
- Caccobius reticuliger D'Orbigny, 1904
- Caccobius rufipennis (Motschulsky, 1858)
- Caccobius scheuerni Cambefort, 1990
- Caccobius schreberi (Linnaeus, 1767)
- Caccobius semiaeneus D'Orbigny, 1905
- Caccobius sericeus Frey, 1958
- Caccobius semiluteus d’Orbigny, 1905
- Caccobius sericoides Balthasar, 1966
- Caccobius setifer D'Orbigny, 1905
- Caccobius signatipennis Harold, 1867
- Caccobius sordidus Harold, 1886
- Caccobius suzukii Matsumura, 1936
- Caccobius tai Cambefort, 1984
- Caccobius torticornis Arrow, 1931
- Caccobius tortus (Sharp, 1875)
- Caccobius tuberifrons D'Orbigny, 1902
- Caccobius ugandicus (Frey, 1975)
- Caccobius ultor (Sharp, 1875)
- Caccobius unicornis (Fabricius, 1798)
- Caccobius upembanus Frey, 1958
- Caccobius villiersi Cambefort, 1975
- Caccobius vulcanus (Fabricius, 1801)
- Caccobius zairensis Walter & Cambefort, 1977
- Caccobius zambiensis Walter, 2014
