= Scarabiasis =

- Other names: Canthariasis or "beetle-disease"
- Specialty: Infectious disease
- Symptoms: Loss of appetite, diarrhea, abdominal cramps, vomiting, nausea, and insects in stool.
- Prevention: Avoidance of unsanitary foods and use of clothing when defecating or indulging in outdoor activities.
- Treatment: Metronidazole and saline purgatives

Scarabiasis, or "beetle-disease", is a condition where beetles temporarily infest the digestive tract of other animals. It can also affect humans, and despite being a rare phenomenon, it is the second most important insectal disease in humans after myiasis, which is caused by the larva of flies. The term is commonly used as a synonym of canthariasis, but the latter refers to the infection of animal tissues by beetle larva, whereas the Scarabiasis refers to the infection by adult beetles. Moreover, Scarabiasis refers to the passing of live beetles in animal faeces. Reported symptoms of scarabiasis include loss of appetite, diarrhea, abdominal cramps, vomiting, nausea, and insects in stool. Scarabiasis has been known to infect the gastrointestinal tract, urogenital system, nasal sinuses, ears, and faces of mammals and other animals.

== Agents ==
Coleoptera constitutes the second most represented insect order in the infections of human organisms, only after Diptera. One of the known agents which can potentially infect humans is the beetle Tenebrio molitor, commonly known as “mealworm”, of the family Tenebrionidae. The life cycle of this organism comprises four stages including egg, larva, pupa and adult forms. The entire life cycle lasts approximately one year. Adult and the larvae feed on grains (hence the name mealworm), meat or decomposing animals including birds, spiders, rodents, lizards and some other beetles. They usually originate from damp, dark places, often in decaying cereals. Larvae of T. molitor are widely available as pet food for birds, fish, and reptiles, and they are growing their importance as food for humans, due to the fact that they are rich in proteins and they are traditionally consumed as food in many Asian countries. The insect is native to Europe, but it is now distributed worldwide. Despite being relatively popular, little is known about the mammalian parasitism of T. molitor. The worm is not obligate parasite of animals. The cigarette beetle, Lasioderma serricorne, is also reported to be an agent of Scarabiasis in humans. In 2016, the Department of Parasitology of the Sun Yat-sen University in Ghuanzhou, China, reported the first case of an eight-year-old girl infected by this beetle.

The urinary system can very rarely be an accidental site of beetle larvae colonization, likely when eggs are laid by adults on the skin surrounding the urethral opening or the urethral meatus and their larvae ascend. Stiles and Hassal cite cases of coleopteran pseudoparasitism of the urinary tract reported for beetles of genus Balaninus, Curculio, Nitidula and Tenebrio.

== Infection ==
Given the limited number of records of scarabiasis occurrence in animals, the most frequent portal of entry of the agent in the host organism is still partially unknown. Some reported cases of scarabiasis in humans from the early 20th century were collected in rural India by Strickland and Roy, professors of medical entomology at the School of Tropical Sciences in Calcutta. The authors hypothesised two possible forms of entry in human organism, both equally probable. The first is the oral ingestion (per os) accidentally with food, when, for instance, young children eat food picked up from dirt or mud floors. The second one is through the anus (per anum). For example, as scarabiasis is more common in children, the time of entrance is possibly when children play outside naked, while they are sleeping, or while they are defecating. The authors speculated that the dung beetles could be attracted to the scent of human feces and crawl into the anus during defecation, but this theory was never confirmed. The more recent evidences described the oral ingestion as the most common way how the parasite entered the host. Infected humans usually host those organisms in the gastro-intestine tract, probably after ingesting it accidentally with contaminated or dirty food. Beetle larvae have been recovered, more rarely, from other human organs, such as tonsils, nose and urinary bladder, or the umbilical cord. Children are, in general, more susceptible hosts given their underdeveloped immune system. Moreover, canthariasis has been reported in a case with HIV/AIDS patients associated with skin ulcer. Ulcers in HIV patients and other diseases related to skin damages could increase susceptibility to a wide range of infections such as canthariasis. The beetles (or their larvae) which may cause canthariasis, can be intermediate hosts of other pathogens. For instance, Tenebrio molitor can be the intermediate hosts of the rat tapeworm, Hymenolepis diminuta. Only anecdotal infections by this organism were recorded in humans, and the large majority of the infected individuals were asymptomatic. However, abdominal pain, irritability, itching, and eosinophilia are among the existing symptoms in a few of the reported cases.

== Diagnosis and treatment ==
Clinical manifestations of canthariasis vary greatly depending on the entry site of the invasion, the insect species, the number of larvae and their target tissue. It should be remembered that canthariasis may, at least initially, not give clear clinical symptoms. Infections may lead to severe damage to infant and older patient upon involvement of important organs of the body. The patients once diagnosed having canthariasis or scarabiasis should be treated in time. Dermatologic symptoms include boils, pruritus, erythema, and severe pain caused by the movement of larvae in the skin and in subcutaneous tissues. During the invasion, a polymorphic inflammatory infiltrate may be observed in neighboring tissues. The most frequently reported complication in this disease is a secondary bacterial infection. Gastric canthariasis, caused by swallowed eggs or larvae, manifests as nausea and vomiting, stomachache and abdominal bloating, loss of appetite and weight loss, or diarrhea resembling intestinal parasite infection. In extreme cases, the larvae penetrate through the wall of the digestive tract and invade other organs; this, however, is rare, because most die before reaching the small intestines. Untreated canthariasis may lead to death of the animal as a result of anaphylactic shock, intoxication or secondary bacterial infection of damaged host tissues. Fatalities among humans are not reported in the scientific literature. However, mortality in other mammals due to canthariasis infection was confirmed, for example, in weaned pigs in large-scale farming.

A canthariasis case was reported in Iran in a 10-year-old boy who contracted a urogenital infection, a rare occurrence in which the beetle was hosted in the urinary system. Symptoms were intermittent, and urine contained brown sediments similar to bladder stones. Debris, hyperemia and inflammation were identified in bladder and in the urethra cystoscopy. However, no larva was seen in bladder and urethra. The patient recovered after oral ivermectin therapy.

The clinical symptoms of the only known infection by Lasioderma serricorne in the human gastrointestinal tract were relatively light.
