= Ilhas Queimada Pequena e Queimada Grande Area of Relevant Ecological Interest =

Natural area off the coast of Brazil

- Área de Relevante Interesse Ecológico Ilhas Queimada Grande e Queimada Pequena
- IUCN category IV (habitat/species management area)
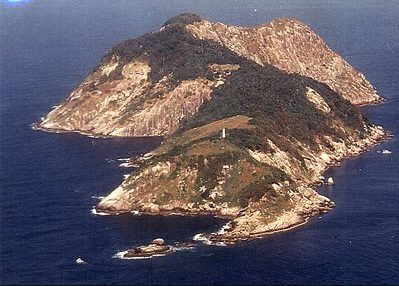
- Ilha da Queimada Grande

- Location within Brazil
- Nearest city: Itanhaém, São Paulo
- Coordinates: 24.485694°S 46.675339°W
- Area: 33 hectares (82 acres)
- Designation: Area of relevant ecological interest
- Created: 5 November 1985
- Administrator: Instituto Chico Mendes de Conservação da Biodiversidade

The Ilhas Queimada Pequena e Queimada Grande Area of Relevant Ecological Interest (Portuguese: Área de Relevante Interesse Ecológico Ilhas Queimada Grande e Queimada Pequena) is an area of relevant ecological interest covering two Atlantic islands off the coast of the state of São Paulo, Brazil.

== Location ==
The Ilhas Queimada Pequena e Queimada Grande Area of Relevant Ecological Interest (ARIE) is in the municipality of Itanhaém, São Paulo. It has an area of 33 hectares (82 acres). It covers the 10 hectares (25 acres) Queimada Pequena and 23 hectares (57 acres) Queimada Grande islands in the Atlantic Ocean. The main island is about 8 kilometres (5.0 mi) from the coast, and has a lighthouse for navigation. There is no beach and no drinking water. The conservation unit is part of the Lagamar Mosaic.

== History ==
The Ilhas Queimada Pequena e Queimada Grande Area of Relevant Ecological Interest was created by federal decree 91.887 of 5 November 1985. The consultative council was created on 15 May 2012. The ARIE is administered by the Chico Mendes Institute for Biodiversity Conservation (ICMBio). It is classed as IUCN protected area category IV (habitat/species management area). Educational tourism and other non-predatory activities are to be controlled in accordance with the provisions of the National Environmental Council (CONAMA).

== Environment ==
Vegetation on the main island is dense shrubs. Fishermen and other visitors, including the builders of the naval lighthouse at the start of the 20th century, brought in invasive grasses that now cover 11.2 hectares (28 acres) of the island. The grasses do not provide a habitat for the endemic species and are highly inflammable.

There are two wrecked ships on the west side. The waters are very clear, with visibility up to 40 metres (130 ft), and are often used by amateur fishers and divers. There are various species including groupers, gray parrotfish (Sparisoma axillare) and Cubera snapper (Lutjanus cyanopterus). Larger fish are found on the Parcel de Fora to the south at depths from 3 to 30 metres (9.8 to 98.4 ft). Over-fishing is a problem, and creation of a national marine park around the island has been proposed for several years.

The main island is also called the Ilha das Cobras due to the many golden lanceheads (Bothrops insularis), a large and venomous pit viper, so landing is not advised. On the mainland the snake's relatives mainly feed on rodents. The island was separated from the mainland by rising sea levels about 9,000 years ago, and the rodent population disappeared, so the snake adapted to eating birds. Its main prey are the migratory white-crested elaenia (Elaenia albiceps), yellow-legged thrush (Turdus flavipes) and double-collared seedeater (Sporophila caerulescens), all of which visit only at certain times of year. Other species include the tiny frog Scinax peixotoi, the lizards Mabuya macrorhyncha and Colobodactylus taunayi and the amphisbaena Amphisbaena hogei and Leposternon microcephalus.

Protected species on or around the islands include the golden lancehead, Sauvage's snail-eater (Dipsas albifrons), green sea turtle (Chelonia mydas), hawksbill sea turtle (Eretmochelys imbricata), La Plata dolphin (Pontoporia blainvillei), smoothback angelshark (Squatina oculata), angular angel shark (Squatina guggenheim) and royal tern (Thalasseus maximus).

== Sources ==
- Arie Ilhas da Queimada Pequena e Queimada Grande (in Portuguese), ICMBio: Chico Mendes Institute for Biodiversity Conservation
- ARIE das Ilhas Queimada Pequena e Queimada Grande (in Portuguese), ISA: Instituto Socioambiental
- Olmos, Fabio (1 December 2011), "Queimada Grande: a Ilha das Loiras Misteriosas", O Eco (in Portuguese)
- Unidade de Conservação: Área de Relevante Interesse Ecológico Ilhas Queimada Grande e Queimada Pequena (in Portuguese), MMA: Ministério do Meio Ambiente
- Unidades de Conservação - Mosaico do Litoral Sul de São Paulo e do Litoral do Paraná - LAGAMAR (in Portuguese), ICMBio, archived from the original on 2019-05-27
