= Selma Maria Almeida-Santos =

Selma Maria de Almeida-Santos is a Brazilian biologist and scientific researcher at the Instituto Butantan in São Paulo. She is a Scientific Researcher VI in the institute's Laboratory of Ecology and Evolution, where she studies the reproductive biology of snakes and lizards.

== Education ==
Almeida-Santos graduated in Biological Sciences from the University of São Paulo (USP) in 1988. She received a master's degree in Biological Sciences, with a specialization in Zoology, from São Paulo State University (UNESP) in 1999. She completed a doctorate in Sciences at USP in 2005, in the area of Anatomy of Domestic and Wild Animals.

== Career ==
Almeida-Santos joined Instituto Butantan in 1990 as a laboratory technician in its Herpetology Laboratory. In 2004, she began working as a scientific researcher at the institute. She later reached the rank of Scientific Researcher VI, the highest level of the institute's scientific research career. From 2019 to 2024, Almeida-Santos served as technical director of the Laboratory of Ecology and Evolution at Instituto Butantan's Centro de Desenvolvimento Científico.

== Research ==
Almeida-Santos's principal research area is the reproduction of snakes and lizards. Her work examines reproductive cycles, sexual maturity, sexual dimorphism, reproductive behavior, sperm storage, and the evolution of reproductive strategies in squamate reptiles. Her research includes comparisons between oviparous and viviparous reproductive modes, as well as studies of social interactions during the reproductive season, including male combat and mating aggregations. She has also investigated assisted-reproduction techniques, including ultrasonography, semen evaluation, and artificial insemination, in connection with the management and conservation of threatened reptiles. A significant part of her research concerns island-endemic jararacas in southeastern Brazil. Projects associated with her work have examined the reproductive biology and conservation of species including Bothrops alcatraz, B. germanoi, B. insularis, B. otavioi, and B. sazimai. Her research has also addressed long-term sperm storage in female snakes. A 1997 paper co-authored with Miguel G. Salomão examined sperm storage in the female neotropical rattlesnake, Crotalus durissus terrificus.

== Academic supervision ==
Almeida-Santos has taught and supervised students in postgraduate programmes associated with USP, UNESP, and Instituto Butantan. Her institutional profile records 34 completed master's dissertations, 21 completed doctoral theses, and three completed postdoctoral supervisions, in addition to ongoing supervision at the time of publication. She has supervised research on the reproductive biology of snakes and lizards, including studies of rattlesnakes, coral snakes, golden lanceheads, and other Brazilian squamates.

== Recognition and public coverage ==
In July 2023, Instituto Butantan published a profile describing Almeida-Santos's more than 30 years of research on snake reproduction and reporting that she had published more than 130 scientific articles at that time. The article discussed her research on reproductive cycles in jararacas and rattlesnakes and on sperm storage in female snakes. In April 2024, Folha de S.Paulo reported that the snake species Tantilla selmae had been named in honor of Almeida-Santos. The article, written by Reinaldo José Lopes, described her work on the reproductive biology of snakes and lizards. In September 2026, Folha de S.Paulo reported that Almeida-Santos was a co-recipient of the 2026 Ig Nobel Prize in Biology. The report discussed research on the defensive behavior of the jararaca, Bothrops jararaca, and the factors associated with whether the snake bites during a human encounter. The award-winning study, “Study of Defensive Behavior of a Venomous Snake as a New Approach to Understand Snakebite,” was published in Scientific Reports in 2024; its authors included João Miguel Alves-Nunes, Adriano Fellone, Selma Maria Almeida-Santos, Carlos Roberto de Medeiros, Ivan Sazima, and Otávio Augusto Vuolo Marques. The paper was later retracted due to the research team not receiving permission from an ethics boards for their soft stepping method nor the approval to experiment on newborn snakes.
