= Area of relevant ecological interest (Brazil) =

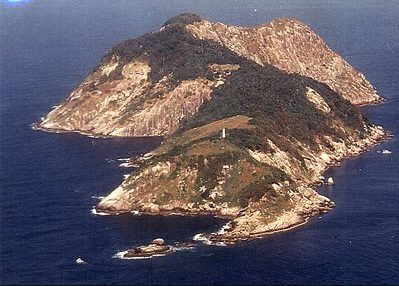
Ilha da Queimada Grande

An area of relevant ecological interest (Note: The term Área de Relevante Interesse Ecológico is usually given a literal (but awkward) translation as "area of relevant ecological interest". Sometimes "relevant" is replaced by "special", "particular", "considerable", etc. and sometimes it is simply translated "Area of ecological interest".) (Portuguese: Área de Relevante Interesse Ecológico, Arie) is a type of protected area of Brazil with unusual natural features and with little or no human occupation.

== Definition ==
"Area of relevant ecological interest" is among the types of sustainable use protected area defined by Law No. 9.985 of 18 July 2000, which established the National System of Conservation Units (SNUC). It is generally a small area with little or no human occupation that has unique natural features or that harbours rare examples of regional biota. It was created to maintain these natural ecosystems of regional or local importance, and to regulate the permissible use of these areas where compatible with the objectives of conservation of nature. The area may consist of public or private land subject to laws which may impose rules and restrictions on use of private land in such an area.

== Examples ==
Areas of relevant ecological interest include:

Name	Level	State	Area (ha)	Established
Biological Dynamics of Forest Fragments Project	Federal	Amazonas	3,288	1985
Buriti de Vassununga	Federal	São Paulo	150	1990
Capetinga/Taquara	Federal	Federal District	2,100	1985
Cerrado Pé de Gigante	Federal	São Paulo	11	1990
Cocorobó	Federal	Bahia	7,500	1984
Floresta da Cicuta	Federal	Rio de Janeiro	131	1985
Guará	State	São Paulo	455	2008
Ilha das Cagarras	Federal	Rio de Janeiro	200	
Ilha do Ameixal	Federal	São Paulo	400	1985
Ilha do Pinheiro e do Pinheirinho	Federal	Paraná	109	
Ilhas Queimada Pequena e Queimada Grande	Federal	São Paulo	33	1985
Japiim-Pentecoste	State	Acre	25,000	2009
Javari Buriti (Javari Mirim)	Federal	Amazonas	15,000	1985
Mamanguape River Mangroves	Federal	Paraíba	5,721	1985
Mata de Santa Genebra	Federal	São Paulo	252	1985
Matão de Cosmópolis	Federal	São Paulo	173	1985
Pontal dos Latinos e Pontal dos Santiagos	Federal	Rio Grande do Sul	2,995	1984
Seringal Nova Esperança	Federal	Acre	2,576	1999
Serra da Abelhas	Federal	Santa Catarina	4,604	1996
Valley of the Dinosaurs	Federal	Paraíba	5,000	1984

== Sources ==
- Áreas protegidas (in Portuguese), Apremavi - Associação de Preservação do Meio Ambiente e da Vida, archived from the original on 2016-05-02
- Área de Relevante Interesse Ecológico (in Portuguese), ISA: Instituto Socioambiental
- Categorias (in Portuguese), ICMBio, archived from the original on 2016-07-13
- "Part VI", First national report for the Convention on Biological Diversity - BRAZIL (PDF), Ministry of Environment
