= Otávio Augusto Vuolo Marques =

Brazilian herpetologist

- Born: Brazil
- Education: University of São Paulo (BSc, MSc, PhD)
- Known for: Research on Brazilian snakes, including Bothrops insularis
- Awards: 2026 Ig Nobel Prize in Biology
- Scientific career
- Fields: Zoology, herpetology, ecology
- Workplaces: Cornell University, Instituto Butantan

Otávio Augusto Vuolo Marques is a Brazilian zoologist and herpetologist. He is a researcher at the Instituto Butantan in São Paulo, where he studies the natural history, ecology, evolution, reproduction and conservation of snakes. His research includes Brazilian pit vipers and other snakes associated with the Atlantic Forest, coastal islands and the Amazon region. He is particularly associated with research on the golden lancehead, Bothrops insularis, a threatened pit viper endemic to Queimada Grande, an island off the coast of the Brazilian state of São Paulo.

== Education ==
Marques completed a bachelor's degree in biological sciences at the University of São Paulo in 1987. He obtained a master's degree in ecology in 1992 and a doctorate in zoology in 1998, also from the University of São Paulo. In 2005, he completed postdoctoral research at Cornell University.

== Career ==
Marques is a researcher and former director of the Laboratory of Ecology and Evolution at the Instituto Butantan. He is an accredited professor in postgraduate programs in animal biology and biodiversity at São Paulo State University and in ecology and evolution at the Federal University of São Paulo. He served as president of the Brazilian Society of Herpetology from 2020 to 2021. His FAPESP profile states that, since 2021, he has been included in lists identifying the world's 2% most-cited scientists in zoology, in the category measuring career-long impact.

== Research ==
Marques's research covers snake natural history, geographical distribution, ecology, evolution, reproduction, behaviour and conservation. His work has included studies of pit vipers, island populations and the effects of environmental conditions on snake populations. One of his principal research subjects is Bothrops insularis, commonly known as the golden lancehead or jararaca-ilhoa. Research on the species has examined its evolutionary history, population size, reproductive ecology, feeding ecology and conservation management. In a 2015 article published by Pesquisa FAPESP, Marques discussed research on snakes from islands off the coast of São Paulo, including Queimada Grande and Alcatrazes. The article described his work on the geographical distribution and natural history of Atlantic Forest snakes and his involvement in conservation-related research on island populations. The article also reported that Marques worked with conservation authorities and other researchers on the management of threatened snake populations. It described his concerns about the possible effects of military exercises and fires on snake populations on Alcatrazes Island. Marques was the principal investigator of a FAPESP-supported project entitled História natural de serpentes sul-americanas: uma abordagem evolutiva (“Natural history of South American snakes: an evolutionary approach”). The project examined the natural history and evolution of South American snakes and contributed information to biodiversity-conservation guidelines for the state of São Paulo.

== Books and science communication ==
Marques has organized or contributed to books and illustrated guides about Brazilian snakes. Serpentes da Amazônia: guia ilustrado (“Snakes of the Amazon: Illustrated Guide”), published in 2023, presents 180 Amazonian snake species through photographs and descriptive information. Serpentes do Pampa: Guia Ilustrado (“Snakes of the Pampa: Illustrated Guide”) was published in 2025. The guide covers 59 snake species from the Pampa biome and includes 83 colour photographs. Marques organized A Ilha das Cobras: biologia, evolução e conservação da jararaca-ilhoa na Queimada Grande (“The Island of Snakes: Biology, Evolution and Conservation of the Golden Lancehead on Queimada Grande”). The book addresses the evolution, ecology, natural history and conservation of Bothrops insularis, a species endemic to Queimada Grande. The book was published to mark the centenary of the 1921 scientific description of the golden lancehead by Afrânio do Amaral, a former director of the Instituto Butantan. The first edition of A Ilha das Cobras was published in 2021. Marques has also participated in science-communication projects. His FAPESP profile identifies him as responsible for “Entenda mais ciência” (“Understand more science”), a project disseminated through a blog and social-media pages.

== 2026 Ig Nobel Prize ==
In 2026, Marques was one of six researchers awarded the Ig Nobel Prize in Biology. The other recipients were João Miguel Alves-Nunes, Adriano Fellone, Selma Maria Almeida-Santos, Carlos Roberto de Medeiros and Ivan Sazima. The award recognised their paper, “Study of Defensive Behavior of a Venomous Snake as a New Approach to Understand Snakebite”. The paper examined defensive behaviour in venomous snakes by recording their responses to repeated approaches and contact involving a researcher wearing protective footwear. The article was published in Scientific Reports in 2024 as volume 14, article 10230. Its authors were João Miguel Alves-Nunes, Adriano Fellone, Selma Maria Almeida-Santos, Carlos Roberto de Medeiros, Ivan Sazima and Otávio Augusto Vuolo Marques. The 2026 Biology Prize citation described the work as repeatedly stepping on different parts of venomous snakes under varying temperatures and at different times of day in order to investigate which circumstances induce a snake to bite a human.

=== Retraction of the snake-bite study ===
On 11 February 2025, Scientific Reports published a retraction notice concerning the snake-bite study. The notice stated that the Animal Ethics Committee of the Instituto Butantan had confirmed that the research approval did not cover the use of newborn snakes or the “soft stepping” method described in the article. The retraction notice stated that all of the authors disagreed with the retraction.

== Selected publications ==
- Marques, Otávio Augusto Vuolo; Martins, Marcio; Sazima, Ivan (2002). “A new insular species of pitviper from Brazil, with comments on evolutionary biology and conservation of the Bothrops jararaca group”. Herpetologica. 58 (3): 303–312.
- Martins, Marcio et al. (2008). “Population size of the golden lancehead, Bothrops insularis, on Queimada Grande Island, Brazil”. South American Journal of Herpetology. 3 (2): 168–174.
- Marques, Otávio Augusto Vuolo; Kasperoviczus, Karina; Almeida-Santos, Selma Maria (2013). “Reproductive ecology of the threatened pitviper Bothrops insularis from Queimada Grande Island, southeast Brazil”. Journal of Herpetology. 47 (3): 393–399.
- Alves-Nunes, João Miguel et al. (2024). “Study of defensive behavior of a venomous snake as a new approach to understand snakebite”. Scientific Reports. 14: 10230. doi:10.1038/s41598-024-59416-6 (Retracted, see doi:10.1038/s41598-025-88686-x, PMID 39934237, Retraction Watch). Retracted.
