= Treasure Quest: Snake Island =

American reality television series

- Created by: Mark Kadin, Will Ehbrecht, Anuj Majumdar
- Directed by: David Carr
- Presented by: Jeremy Whalen
- Country of origin: United States
- Original language: English
- No. of seasons: 3
- No. of episodes: 21 (list of episodes)

Production
- Executive producers: Joseph Boyle; Mark Kadin; Anuj Majumdar; Will Ehbrecht
- Running time: 60 minutes
- Production company: MAK Pictures

Original release
- Network: Discovery Channel
- Release: July 17, 2015 – October 6, 2018

Related
- Treasure Quest (2009)

Treasure Quest: Snake Island is an American reality television series produced by MAK Pictures for the Discovery Channel. The series follows a crew of treasure hunters led by Jeremy Whalen (including champion freediver Mehgan Heaney-Grier) as they search for the legendary trove of Incan treasure known as the Treasure of the Trinity throughout South America.

== Overview ==
=== Season 1 (2015) ===
The crew focuses the search on Ilha da Queimada Grande sometimes referred by its nickname "Snake Island" located in the Brazilian state of São Paulo. The treasure hunt is fraught with extreme danger because the small island is home to thousands of deadly golden lancehead pit vipers with one snake per square meter. Additionally, the team has to contend with armed black-market snake poachers, bullet ants, inhospitable terrain, and hazardous coastal waters populated with sharks, jellyfish, and roaming pirates.

=== Season 2 (2016) ===
The crew searches various locations throughout Paraguay and Argentina. Land dangers include venomous snakes such as the jararaca pit viper, venomous spiders and insects, man-eating jaguars, drug traffickers, highway bandits, rival treasure hunters, and jealous locals; river dangers include low-visibility waters, unpredictable currents, fast-moving debris, pirates, caimans, piranhas, vampire fish, and stingrays.

Centuries-old map markings discovered on Snake Island during the previous season lead the team to their first site of interest, a long-deserted Guarani village along the bank of the Paraguay River in Paraguay.

The team moves to the second site in Paraguay, the remains of the former Trinidad Mission founded by Catholic Jesuit missionaries in the early 17th century.

Information provided by a black market dealer leads the crew to the third site, the former Jesuit mission of Santa Ana in the neighboring country of Argentina.

=== Season 3 (2018) ===
Shawn Cowles, Technology Specialist Jeremy Whalen, and Demolition Expert Jack Peters went to Bolivia in search of the Sacambaya Treasure, which has an estimated value of $2 billion.

=== Broadcast ===
Season 1 premiered in the United States on July 17, 2015. Season 2 debuted in the U.S. on November 4, 2016.

Season 1 premiered in Australia on September 1, 2015, on Discovery Channel Australia.

== Controversy ==
In 2018, Season 1 and 2 expedition leader Cork Graham released the book So You Want to Be a "Reality" TV Star: Everything I Learned About Sex, Drugs, Fraud, Rock and Roll, and Vipers as Team Leader of Discovery Channel's Treasure Quest: Snake Island In it, he alleges that most of the episodes were heavily scripted and most discoveries were faked or planted, including the climax find of Series 2. What was explained to be a mask of the Incan sun god valued at $250,000 was in fact a plastic model that was distressed to appear genuine. He alleges that a co-star physically assaulted him during filming, leading to him suing the Discovery Network.

== Episodes ==
=== Series overview ===
Season	Episodes	Originally released	
Season	Episodes	First released	Last released
1	6	July 17, 2015	August 21, 2015
2	7	November 4, 2016	December 16, 2016
3	8	August 25, 2018	October 6, 2018

=== Season 1 (2015) ===
No. overall	No. in season	Title	Original release date	U.S. viewers (millions)
1	1	"What Lies Beneath"	July 17, 2015	2.001
2	2	"Into The Nightmare"	July 24, 2015	1.689
3	3	"Strikes Back"	July 31, 2015	1.556
4	4	"Heart Of Darkness"	August 7, 2015	1.716
5	5	"No Exit"	August 14, 2015	1.576
6	6	"Fortune's Doorstep"	August 21, 2015	1.831

=== Season 2 (2016) ===
No. overall	No. in season	Title	Original release date	U.S. viewers (millions)
7	1	"The Trail Of Blood"	November 4, 2016	1.294
8	2	"A Cursed Fortune"	November 11, 2016	1.369
9	3	"Treasure Found!"	November 18, 2016	1.432
10	4	"Brush With Death"	November 25, 2016	1.347
11	5	"Jaguars Gold"	December 2, 2016	1.50
12	6	"Cappy's Curse"	December 9, 2016	1.48
13	7	"Striking Gold"	December 16, 2016	7.9

=== Season 3 (2018) ===
No. overall	No. in season	Title	Original release date	U.S. viewers (millions)
14	1	"Death Road to Fortune"	August 25, 2018	N/A
15	2	"Break In"	September 1, 2018	N/A
16	3	"Death Trap"	September 8, 2018	N/A
17	4	"Blast Away"	September 14, 2018	N/A
18	5	"Closing in on The fortune"	September 21, 2018	N/A
19	6	"Hot on The Trail"	September 29, 2018	N/A
20	7	"Payday"	October 6, 2018	N/A
21	8	"Big Risk, Bigger Reward"	October 13, 2018	N/A
