= Mehgan Heaney-Grier =

American freediver and television personality (born 1977)

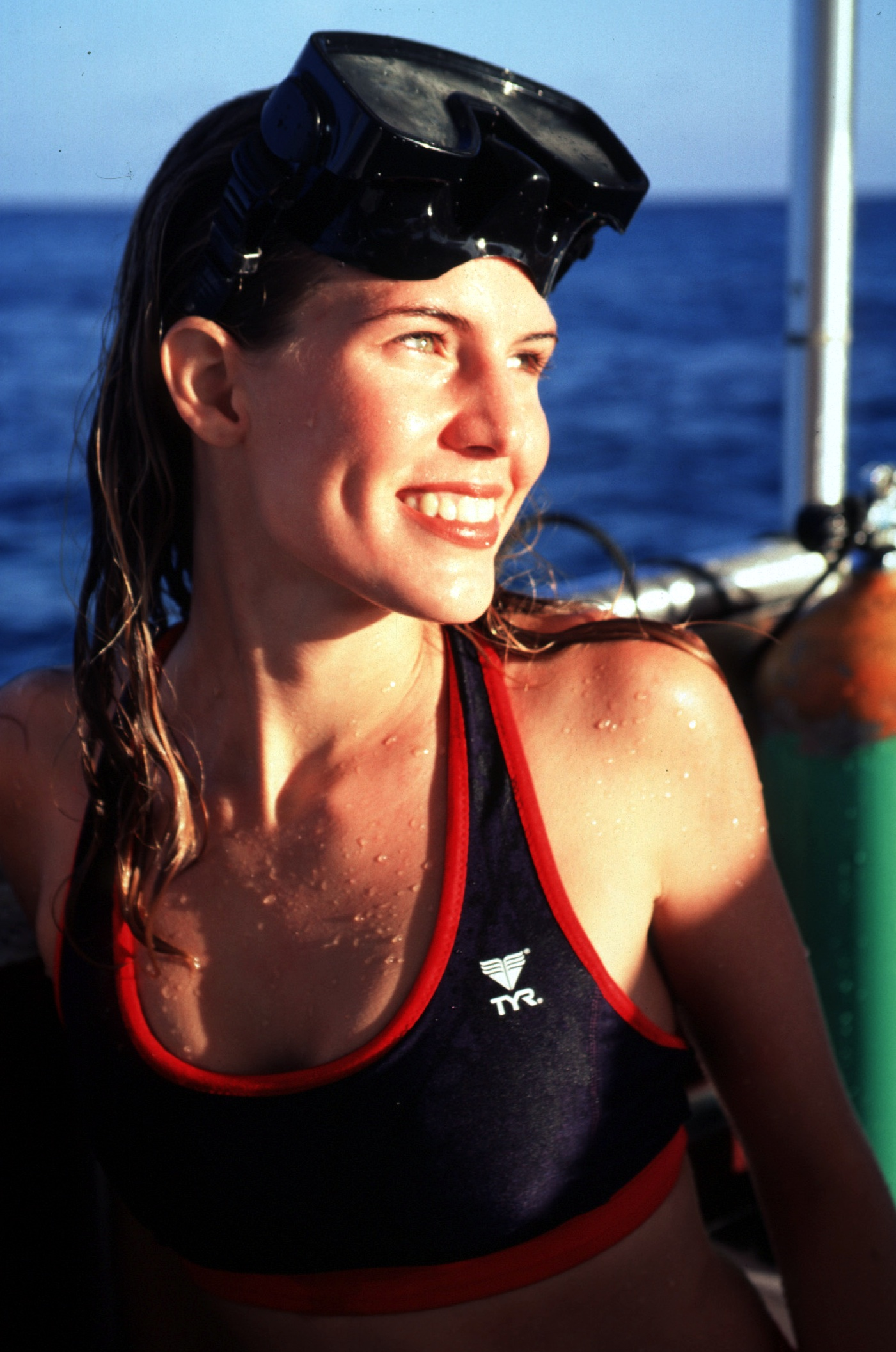
- Born: Mehgan Renee Heaney; August 26, 1977 (age 48); Duluth, Minnesota
- Occupations: Fashion model, free-diver

Mehgan Heaney-Grier (born Mehgan Renee Heaney; August 26, 1977) is an American champion freediver, fashion model, actress, conservationist, and TV personality.

== Early life ==
Heaney-Grier was born in Duluth, Minnesota to Bill and Renee Heaney. Her parents divorced when she was six years old. When she was eleven years old her mother remarried to Nelson Grier and in the summer of 1989, Heaney-Grier, along with her sister Erin, mother and new stepfather moved to the Florida Keys. When she was 16 years old, she legally changed her last name to Heaney-Grier.

== Freediving ==
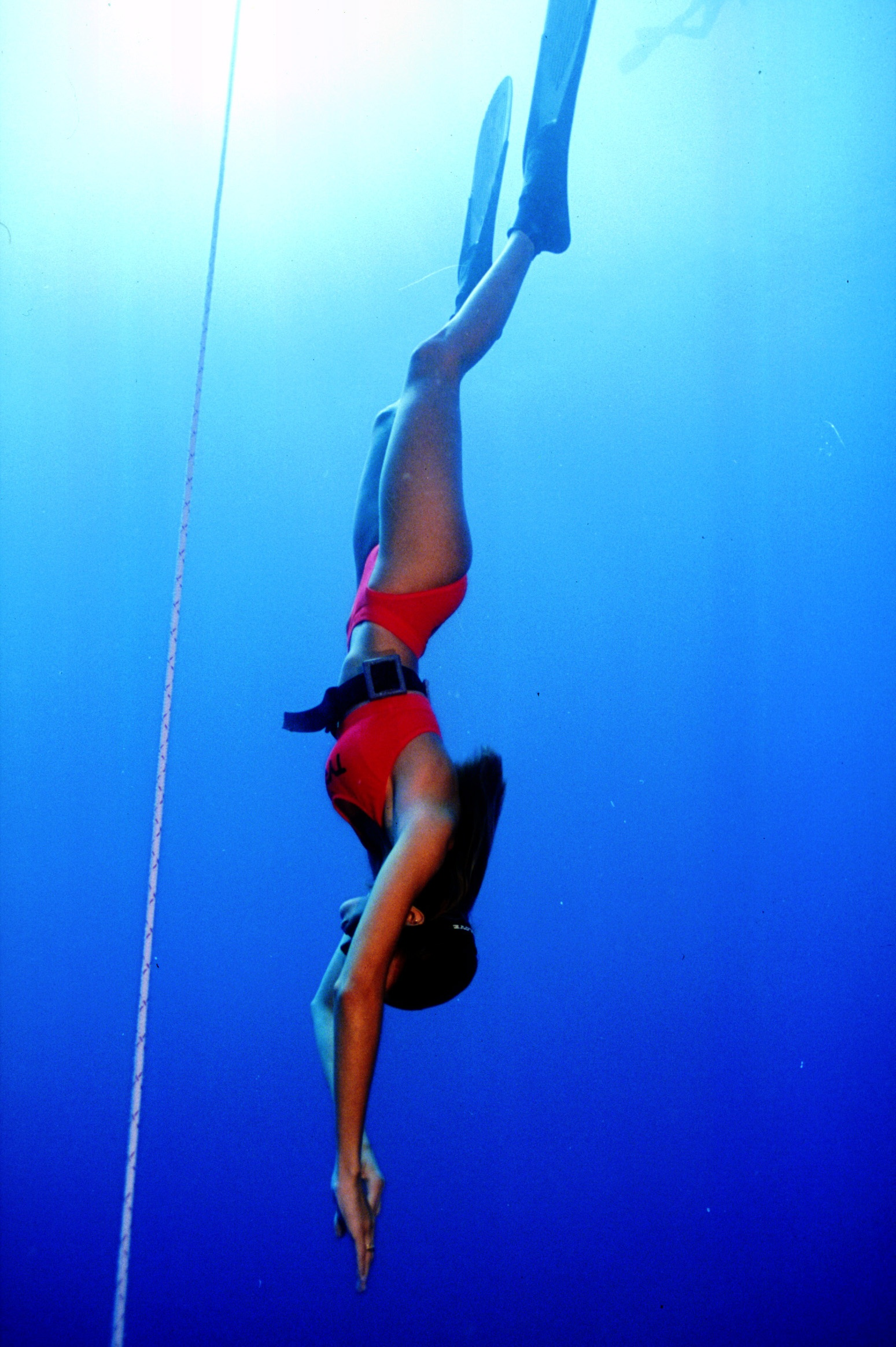
Heaney-Grier on record setting freedive 1997

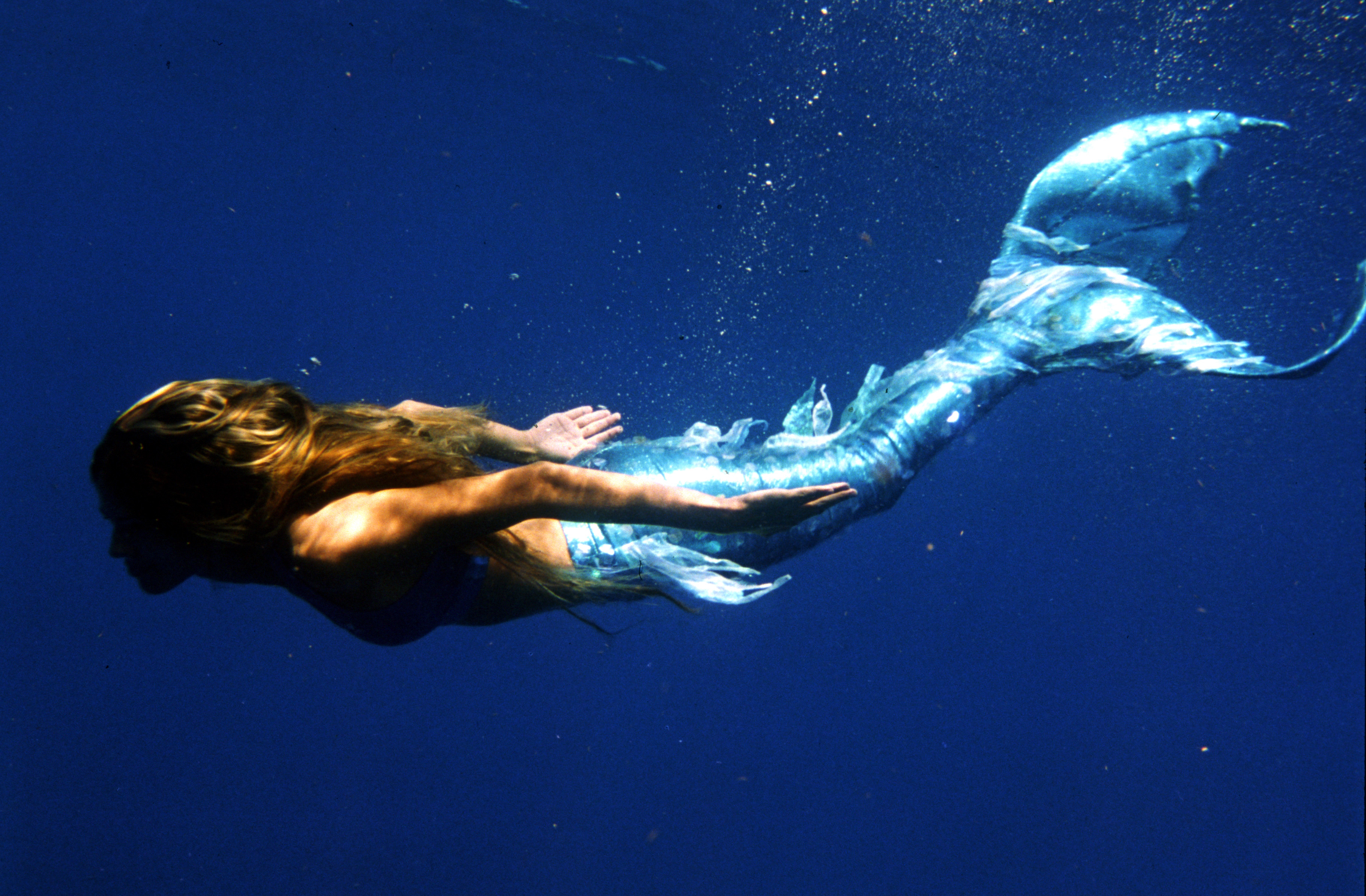
Free-diver Mehgan Heaney-Grier swimming while wearing a mermaid tail.

In 1996 at the age of 18 Heaney-Grier established the first constant weight free-diving record in the United States with a dive to 155 feet (47 meters) on a single breath of air. The following year she beat her own record with a dive to 165 feet (50 meters), When she set her second US record, the women's world record for free diving was 204.5 feet (62.3 meters).

In 1998 Heaney-Grier captained the first United States Freediving Team to compete in the World Cup Freediving Championships held in Sardinia, Italy. In 2000, Heaney-Grier was inducted as part of the inaugural roster into the Women Divers Hall of Fame.

== Modeling ==
Heaney-Grier has modeled for, and been featured in, numerous catalogs and magazines including People, Outside, Life, Vogue Japan, Abercrombie & Fitch. She has also been a public relations ambassador for Omega Watches.

== Television ==
In the late 1990s, Heaney-Grier partnered with her diving trainers, Manny Puig and Mark Rackley (who was at the time also Heaney-Grier's boyfriend), filming underwater encounters with animals such as alligators and sharks. Rackley had worked as a spearfisherman and underwater videographer, and Puig had experience as an animal handler on movie sets and had learned how to ride and handle alligators in their environment. Together with Heaney-Grier, they formed a company named Extreme Encounters, and the footage they produced led to the Animal Planet series titled Extreme Contact. The 20-episode series featured the trio in cage-free encounters with sharks, alligators and other aquatic wildlife. They also worked on a USA Network one-hour special titled "Deep Diver: Tiger Shark Odyssey". In 2002, Heaney-Grier went on to other projects.

In 1999 Heaney-Grier had a guest-starring role as a free-diver on an episode of Baywatch, and a starring role on a UPN movie of the week, Avalon:Beyond the Abyss, produced by Viacom Productions. Heaney-Grier has been a featured guest on the Late Show with David Letterman, London's TFI Friday, Primetime Live with Anderson Cooper and Ripley's Believe it or Not. Heaney-Grier also hosted Saturn's Gravity Files, covering the Gravity Games in 2004, and the Mad Fin Shark Series for ESPN in 2008.

In 2015 Heaney-Grier co-starred as a member of a 5-person exploration team on the reality show Treasure Quest: Snake Island, which documents the search for the legendary Treasure of the Trinity on Snake Island, Brazil.

== Stunt work ==
In 2003, Heaney-Grier was sought by the director of Pirates of the Caribbean: The Curse of the Black Pearl, Gore Verbinski, to perform an underwater stunt for Keira Knightley. Heaney-Grier has also performed underwater stunts, including scuba diving, free diving and working with sharks, as a stunt double for Jessica Alba and Ashley Scott in Into the Blue, and for actress Olivia Wilde in Turistas.

== Other work ==
Heaney-Grier was featured in the books A Family of Women by Carolyn Jones. and Freedive! by Terry Maas and David Sipperly,

== Personal life ==
Heaney-Grier married Silas Binkley on June 6, 2010. For seven years she has been the guardian of a rescued wolf-dog hybrid named Rontu, and they are in the process of becoming a registered team for animal-assisted therapy work. Heaney-Grier graduated from the University of Colorado at Boulder in 2011 with both a B.A. degree in Ecology and Evolutionary Biology and a B.A. in Anthropology. They have one child together, Cash, born 2013.
