= A. sanctaeritae =

A. sanctaeritae may refer to:

- Amphisbaena sanctaeritae, a worm lizard species in the family Amphisbaenidae
- Asplundia sanctae-ritae, a plant species in the genus Asplundia

== See also ==
- Sanctaeritae (disambiguation)
