= Mussurana (genus) =

Scientific classification
- Kingdom: Animalia
- Phylum: Chordata
- Class: Reptilia
- Order: Squamata
- Suborder: Serpentes
- Family: Colubridae
- Subfamily: Dipsadinae
- Genus: Mussurana; Zaher, Grazziotin, Cadle, Murphy, de Moura-Leite & Bonatto, 2009

Genus of snakes

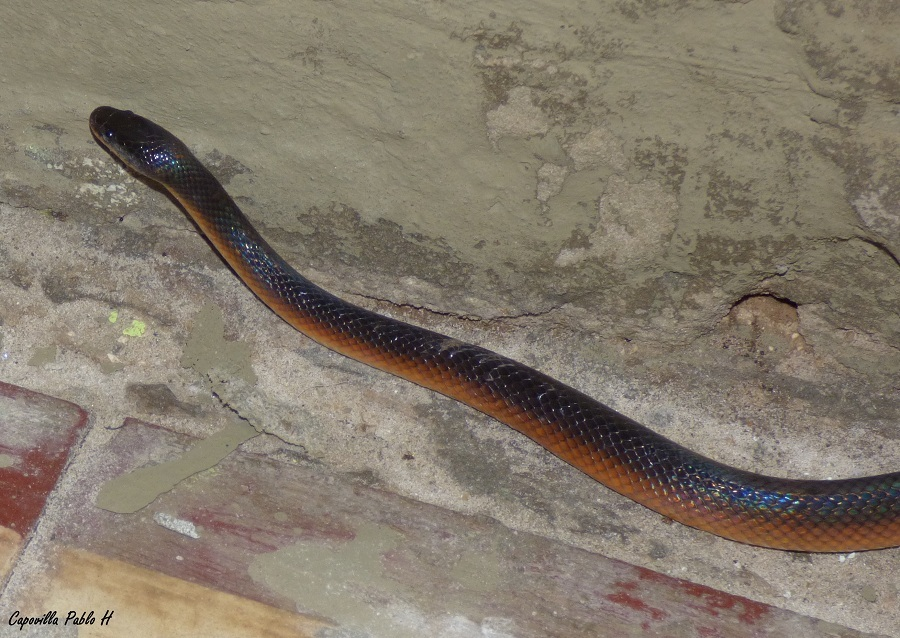
Two-colored Mussurana (Mussurana bicolor).

Mussurana is a genus of snakes in the family Colubridae. The genus is endemic to South America.

== Species and geographic ranges ==
The genus Mussurana contains the following species which are recognized as being valid.

- Mussurana bicolor (Peracca, 1904) – Argentina, southern Brazil, Paraguay, and Peru - two-colored mussurana
- Mussurana montana (Franco, Marques & Puorto, 1997) – southeastern Brazil
- Mussurana quimi (Franco, Marques & Puorto, 1997) – northern Argentina, southeastern Brazil, and Paraguay

Nota bene: A binomial authority in parentheses indicates that the species was originally described in a genus other than Mussurana.

== Etymology ==
The specific name, quimi, is in honor of Brazilian herpetologist Joaquim "Quim" Cavalheiro of the Instituto Butantan.
