= Buriti de Vassununga Area of Relevant Ecological Interest =

- IUCN category IV (habitat/species management area)
- Location within Brazil
- Nearest city: São Carlos, São Paulo
- Coordinates: 21.70372°S 47.41554°W
- Area: 150.97 hectares (373.1 acres)
- Designation: Area of relevant ecological interest
- Created: 6 June 1990
- Administrator: ICMBio

Buriti de Vassununga Area of Relevant Ecological Interest (Portuguese: Área de Relevante Interesse Ecológico Buriti de Vassununga) is an area of relevant ecological interest, a sustainable use protected area, in the state of São Paulo, Brazil.

== Location ==
Buriti de Vassununga is in the Atlantic Forest biome and covers 150.97 hectares (373.1 acres). The conservation unit is in the municipality of Santa Rita do Passa Quatro, which has a total area of 75,299 hectares (186,070 acres). It is near the Cerrado Pé de Gigante Area of Relevant Ecological Interest. It was created by decree 99.276 of 6 June 1990 and is administered at the federal level by the Chico Mendes Institute for Biodiversity Conservation (ICMBio).

== Conservation ==
Vassununga is classed as IUCN protected area category IV (habitat/species management area), with the objective of maintaining natural ecosystems of regional or local importance and regulating permissible use of these areas to make it compatible with the objectives of conserving nature. Activities that might damage the environment are banned, including competitive sports, overgrazing, harvesting of natural products, installation of industries, construction of buildings, any activities that prevent regeneration of natural plants, soil erosion or silting of waterways, and any activities that may jeopardise the integrity of the ecosystems and harmony of the landscape.

The public agencies of the state of São Paulo may monitor compliance, but the Brazilian Institute of Environment and Renewable Natural Resources (IBAMA) retains the right to supplementary action.

== Sources ==
- Arie Buriti de Vassununga (in Portuguese), Chico Mendes Institute for Biodiversity Conservation
- Buriti de Vassununga (in Portuguese), ISA: Instituto Socioambiental
- Unidade de Conservação: Área de Relevante Interesse Ecológico Vassununga (in Portuguese), MMA: Ministério do Meio Ambiente
