= Seringal Nova Esperança Area of Relevant Ecological Interest =

Protected area in Brazil

- Área de Relevante Interesse Ecológico Seringal Nova Esperança
- IUCN category IV (habitat/species management area)
- Location within Brazil
- Nearest city: Xapuri, Acre
- Coordinates: 10.88462°S 68.43488°W
- Area: 3,288 hectares (8,120 acres)
- Designation: Area of relevant ecological interest
- Created: 1999
- Administrator: ???

The Seringal Nova Esperança Area of Relevant Ecological Interest (Portuguese: Área de Relevante Interesse Ecológico Seringal Nova Esperança: ARIE-SNE) is an area of relevant ecological interest in the state of Acre, Brazil.

== Location ==
Sketch map of conservation units in the east of the state of Acre, Brazil. No 4: Seringal Nova Esperança.

The Biological Dynamics of Forest Fragments Project Area of Relevant Ecological Interest (ARIE-SNE) is 100% in the municipality of Epitaciolândia in Acre, with a total area of 2,576 hectares (6,370 acres).
