= Mussurana quimi =

Conservation status
- Least Concern (IUCN 3.1)

Scientific classification
- Kingdom: Animalia
- Phylum: Chordata
- Class: Reptilia
- Order: Squamata
- Suborder: Serpentes
- Family: Colubridae
- Genus: Mussurana
- Species: M. quimi

Binomial name
- Mussurana quimi Franco, Marques, & Puorto, 1997

Species of snake

Mussurana quimi is a species of snake in the family Colubridae. The species is native to Brazil, Argentina, and Paraguay.
