= Santa Rita do Passa Quatro =

- Municipality
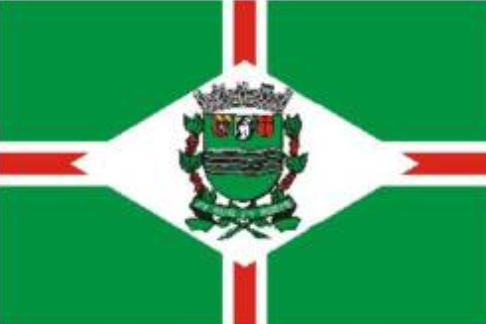
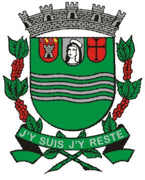
- Flag Coat of arms

- Location in São Paulo state

- Location in Brazil
- Coordinates: 21°42′37″S 47°28′41″W
- Country: Brazil
- Region: Southeast
- State: São Paulo

Area
  - Total: 754 km^{2} (291 sq mi)

Population (2020)
  - Total: 27,600
  - Density: 36.6/km^{2} (94.8/sq mi)
- Time zone: UTC−3 (BRT)

Santa Rita do Passa Quatro is a municipality in the state of São Paulo in Brazil. The elevation is 748 metres (2,454 ft).

The population is 27,600 (2020 estimate) in an area of 754 square kilometres (291 sq mi).

The municipality holds the Cerrado Pé de Gigante Area of Relevant Ecological Interest and the Buriti de Vassununga Area of Relevant Ecological Interest. It contains the 2,071-hectare (5,120-acre) Vassununga State Park, established in 1970, which contains what may be the oldest tree in Brazil.

A species of amphisbaenian, Amphisbaena sanctaeritae, is named after the municipality.

== Media ==
In telecommunications, the city was served by Telecomunicações de São Paulo. In July 1998, this company was acquired by Telefónica, which adopted the Vivo brand in 2012. The company is currently an operator of cell phones, fixed lines, internet (fiber optics/4G) and television (satellite and cable).

== See also ==
- List of municipalities in São Paulo
- Interior of São Paulo
