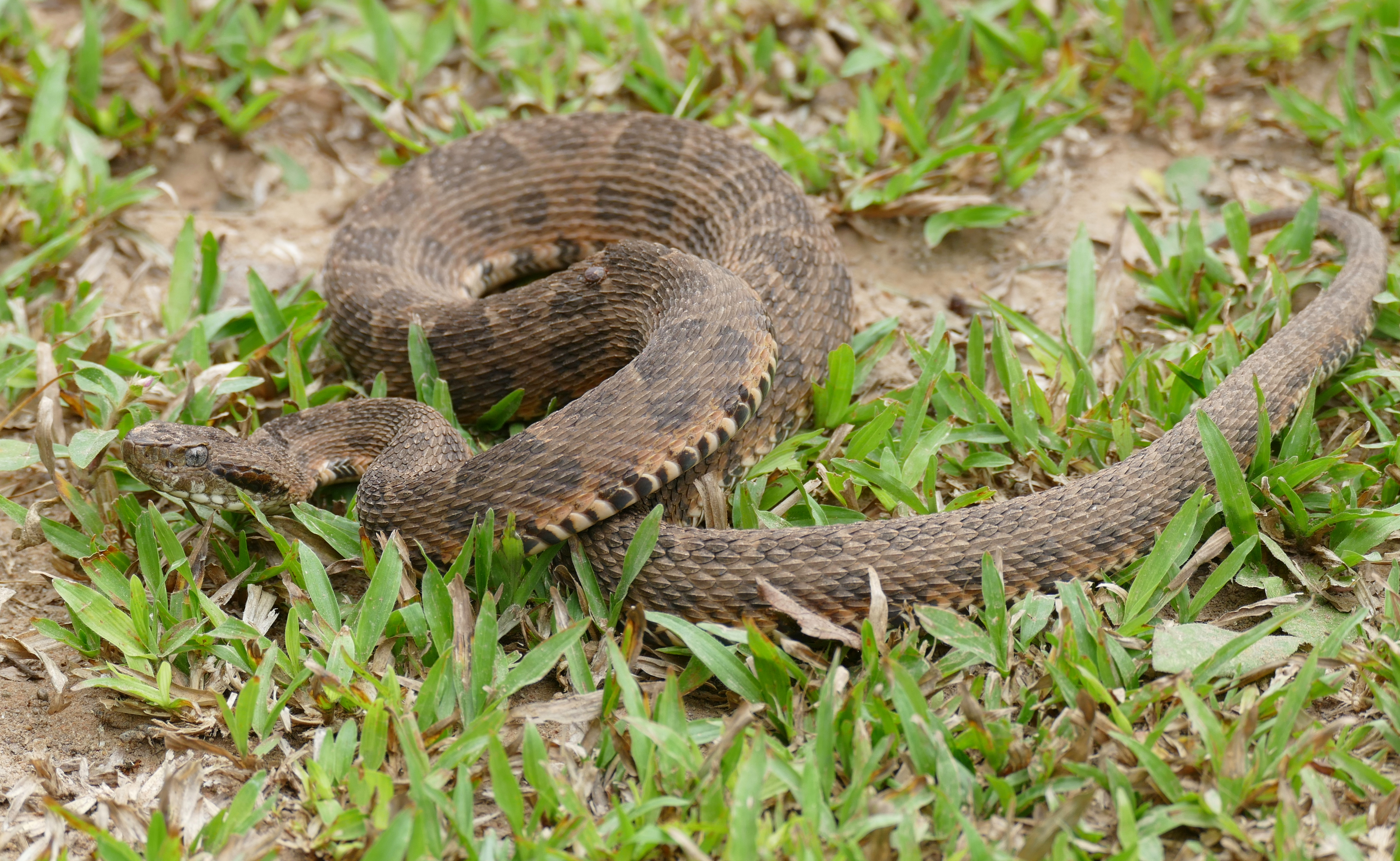

Scientific classification
- Kingdom: Animalia
- Phylum: Chordata
- Class: Reptilia
- Order: Squamata
- Suborder: Serpentes
- Family: Viperidae
- Genus: Bothrops
- Species: B. mattogrossensis

Binomial name
- Bothrops mattogrossensis Amaral, 1925

Synonyms
- Bothropoides matogrossensis (Amaral, 1925); Bothrops neuwiedi subsp. boliviana Amaral, 1927; Bothrops neuwiedi subsp. bolivianus Hoge; Bothrops neuwiedi subsp. mattogrossensis Amaral, 1925

= Bothrops mattogrossensis =

Species of snake

Bothrops mattogrossensis, also known as Boca-de-Sapo, Jararaca, and Jararaca-Pintada in Portuguese, is a species of pit viper from Argentina, Bolivia, Brazil and Peru. As with all vipers, they are venomous. It has been mistaken for a subspecies of Bothrops neuweidi.

== Description ==
Bothrops mattogrossensis has a unique colouring of its supralabial scales, with them either being uniform or displaying large dark markings which take up 50% of the supralabials and always meet under the eye. Its body also displays large dark markings, and its head displays stripes around the eyes.

== Diet ==
Bothrops mattogrossensis is known to eat mammals, frogs, lizards, other snakes, and centipedes, giving it a varied diet compared to other pit vipers such as B. neuweidi.

== Scientific naming ==
The name mattogrossensis comes from the name of the area the species was first found in, Mato Grosso. Amaral misspelt the area name as Matto-Grosso in his paper, and so the "proper" name is believed to be matogrossensis. However, the original spelling is the official name and so it is expected to be spelt as such in official papers.

== Reproduction ==
Bothrops mattogrossensis reproduces sexually and is ovoviviparous.
