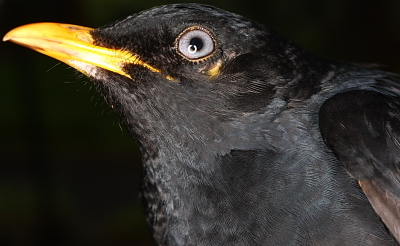

Conservation status
- Least Concern (IUCN 3.1)

Scientific classification
- Kingdom: Animalia
- Phylum: Chordata
- Class: Aves
- Order: Passeriformes
- Family: Turdidae
- Genus: Turdus
- Species: T. leucops

Binomial name
- Turdus leucops Taczanowski, 1877

Synonyms
- See text

Audio

= Pale-eyed thrush =

Species of bird

The pale-eyed thrush (Turdus leucops) is a species of bird in the family Turdidae, the thrushes and allies. It is found in Bolivia, Brazil, Colombia, Ecuador, Guyana, Peru, Suriname, and Venezuela.

== Taxonomy and systematics ==
The pale-eyed thrush has a complicated taxonomic history. It was originally described in 1877 with its current binomial Turdus leucops. In the later nineteenth and early twentieth centuries it was placed in genera Merula and then Planesticus. For much of the twentieth century it was placed in genus Platycichla and for a time treated as a subspecies of the yellow-legged thrush (then P. flavipes, now T. flavipes). Following several phylogenetic studies, in the early twenty-first century taxonomic systems merged Platycichla into Turdus.

The pale-eyed thrush is monotypic.

== Description ==
The pale-eyed thrush is 19.5 to 23.5 cm (7.7 to 9.3 in) long and weighs 54 to 80 g (1.9 to 2.8 oz). The species is sexually dimorphic. Adult males are almost entirely glossy bluish black with sometimes some white on the chin. They have a bluish white iris and sometimes a pale yellow-orange eye-ring, a bright yellow to orange bill, and bright yellow to orange legs and feet that match the bill. Adult females have mostly olive-brown upperparts. They have faint buff-yellow streaks on the ear coverts and sometimes yellowish buff edges on the primaries. Their chin and throat are light brown to buff with brown streaks or spots. Their belly is light brown. They have a light brown, gray-brown, or brown iris without an eye-ring, a black or brown bill, and fuscous-washed yellow legs and feet. Juveniles resemble adult females but with less of an olive tinge. They have buff-yellow streaks on their head and upperparts. Their chin and throat are brown with darker "arrowhead" marks. Their breast is brown with small fuscous blotches and their belly and undertail coverts plain brown. They have a light brown iris without an eye-ring, usually a black bill, and fuscous or yellow-fuscous legs and feet.

== Distribution and habitat ==
The pale-eyed thrush has a highly disjunct distribution. In Venezuela it is found in the Andes from Lara and south into Colombia's Eastern Andes, in the Coastal Range from Carabobo to Miranda, and on tepuis in the states of Amazonas and Bolívar. It is also found on tepuis in Guyana, Suriname, and extreme northern Brazil. In Colombia it is found in the upper valley of the Magdalena River and south along both slopes of the Western Andes. From Colombia its range continues along both slopes of the Andes of Ecuador. In the west it extends to Pichincha Province and on the east slope continues through Peru into Bolivia to western Santa Cruz Department.

The pale-eyed thrush inhabits humid to very wet pristine forest, especially cloudforest. It also inhabits wet semi-deciduous and riparian forest, mature secondary forest, and shaded coffee plantations. It shuns built-up areas. In Venezuela it ranges in elevation between 900 and 2,000 m (3,000 and 6,600 ft) north of the Orinoco River and between 1,100 and 1,800 m (3,600 and 5,900 ft) south of it. It ranges between 1,000 and 1,800 m (3,300 and 5,900 ft) in Brazil, between 1,000 and 2,000 m (3,300 and 6,600 ft) in Colombia, mostly between 1,000 and 2,000 m (3,300 and 6,600 ft) in Ecuador, and mostly between 850 and 2,000 m (2,800 and 6,600 ft) but locally to 2,600 m (8,500 ft) in Peru.

== Behavior ==
=== Movement ===
The pale-eyed thrush is mostly a sedentary year-round resident though some local and elevational movements have been noted following the breeding season.

=== Feeding ===
The pale-eyed thrush feeds primarily on seeds and berries. It also includes invertebrates and small vertebrates in its diet. During the breeding season it forages singly or in pairs and outside of it may gather in small to medium-size flocks in fruiting trees. It forages primarily from the forest's mid-level to the lower parts of its canopy and in lesser amounts lower than that including on the ground. It takes fruit while perched and when briefly hovering. It follows army ant swarms to capture small prey fleeing the ants. Animals appear to be taken mostly opportunistically while exploring bromeliads and when following ants.

=== Breeding ===
The pale-eyed thrush's breeding season has not been fully defined. In Venezuela it apparently spans from April to June, but possibly starting in March and extending to August. In Colombia it breeds between April and June and in Ecuador its season includes December and January. It builds a cup nest from moss and plant fibers and sometimes has soil at the bottom of the cup. Nests have been discovered between about 0.7 and 4 m (2 and 13 ft) above the ground in trees; they have also been found on the ground on earthen banks. The clutch is usually two eggs that are greenish to light blue with brown to red-brown blotches. The incubation period is 13 to 15 days and fledging occurs about 18 days after hatch. The female alone incubates the clutch but both parents provision nestlings.

=== Vocalization ===
The pale-eyed thrush's song is a "disjointed, choppy but fine series of short phrases, many high and thin, usually with long pauses, wheero-weet, chup-e, ez-t, e-ta, ti’t, eez, cheur-ez-weet, ééskee, weewee…". Its calls include fragments from its song, "usually wheero-weet", a "high ringing ti-seee", "a descending seeee", and "a rising pit-tsee´ e´ é". The species usually sings at dawn and into the morning and then again in later afternoon into dusk. It usually sings from high in the canopy but sometimes from a much lower perch.

== Status ==
The IUCN has assessed the pale-eyed thrush as being of Least Concern. It has a very large range; its population size is not known and is believed to be decreasing. No immediate threats have been identified. It is considered "rare to uncommon and perhaps also local" in Venezuela, uncommon in Colombia, "scarce and seemingly local (and erratic?) in Ecuador, and uncommon in Peru. It occurs only in isolated areas in Brazil.
