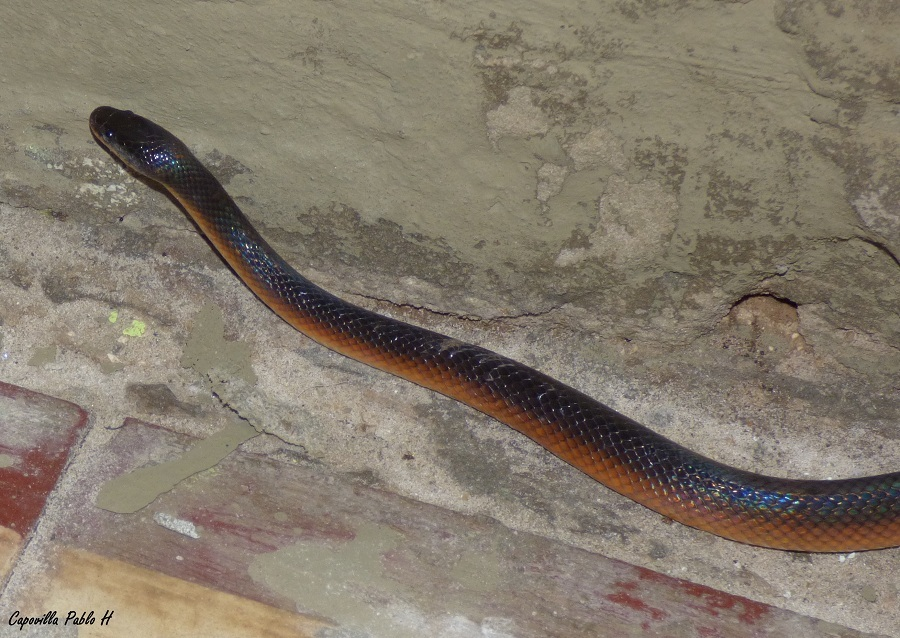

Conservation status
- Least Concern (IUCN 3.1)

Scientific classification
- Kingdom: Animalia
- Phylum: Chordata
- Class: Reptilia
- Order: Squamata
- Suborder: Serpentes
- Family: Colubridae
- Genus: Mussurana
- Species: M. bicolor

Binomial name
- Mussurana bicolor (Peracca, 1904)

Synonyms
- Oxyrhopus bicolor Peracca, 1904; Clelia bicolor — J. Peters & Orejas-Miranda, 1970; Mussurana bicolor — Zaher et al., 2009

= Mussurana bicolor =

Species of snake

Mussurana bicolor, the two-colored mussurana, is a species of snake in the family Colubridae. The species is native to southern South America.

== Description ==
M. bicolor may attain a maximum total length (including tail) of 99 cm (39 in). Adults are gray or brown dorsally, and ivory ventrally. Juveniles are brick red dorsally, with a black vertebral stripe.

== Distribution and habitat ==
M. bicolor is found in Argentina, southern Brazil, Paraguay, and Peru. The preferred natural habitats are grassland, savanna, and forest.

== Ecology and behaviour ==
M. bicolor is oviparous.
