= Cerrado Pé de Gigante Area of Relevant Ecological Interest =

Protected natural area in Brazil

- Área de Relevante Interesse Ecológico Pé-de-Gigante
- IUCN category IV (habitat/species management area)
- Location within Brazil
- Nearest city: Ribeirão Preto, São Paulo
- Coordinates: 21.628°S 47.629°W
- Area: 1,199 hectares (2,960 acres)
- Designation: Area of relevant ecological interest
- Created: 6 June 1990
- Administrator: ICMBio

Cerrado Pé de Gigante Area of Relevant Ecological Interest (Portuguese: Área de Relevante Interesse Ecológico Pé-de-Gigante) is an area of relevant ecological interest, a sustainable use protected area, in the state of São Paulo, Brazil. It preserves a sample of Cerrado vegetation.

== History ==
The Area of relevant ecological interest (ARIE) was at one time part of the property of the Vassununga Sugar Mill, which went bankrupt in the late 1960s. Four plots covered in seasonal forest and one, Pé-de-Gigante, covered in Cerrado vegetation became the property of the state. On 26 October 1970 these five plots became the Vassununga State Park, the responsibility of the São Paulo State Forestry Institute. On 3 December 1971 another portion of land covered in seasonal forest was added to the Vassununga State Park, while the Pé-de-Gigante was assigned to the University of São Paulo (USP) Institute of Biosciences, and became the Mangaíba Biological Station. There followed more than two decades of legal disputes between the USP and the Forestry Institute.

The Cerrado Pé de Gigante Area of Relevant Ecological Interest was created by decree 99.275 on 6 June 1990, and is administered at the federal level by the Chico Mendes Institute for Biodiversity Conservation (ICMBio). In 1995 it was agreed that the ARIE would be jointly managed by the USP Biosciences Institute and the Forestry Institute. Under an agreement of 3 July 1997 the ARIE became a part of Vassununga State Park. It is classed as IUCN protected area category IV (habitat/species management area), with the objective of maintaining natural ecosystems of regional or local importance and regulating permissible use of these areas to make it compatible with the objectives of conserving nature.

== Location ==
Cerrado Pé-de-Gigante covers an area of 1,199 hectares (2,960 acres). It is in the municipality of Santa Rita do Passa Quatro in the state of São Paulo. It is not far from the Buriti de Vassununga Area of Relevant Ecological Interest, which was also created on 6 June 1990. The terrain is gently rolling. The area has altitudes ranging from 590 to 740 metres (1,940 to 2,430 ft) above sea level. The climate is "Central Brazil Tropical" or "Subtropical Savannah". Average annual temperature is below 22 °C (72 °F), higher in the summer. Annual rainfall averages over 1,300 millimetres (51 in), with a dry season from May to September.

== Environment ==
The surrounding region is mainly covered in cerrado, with areas of semi-deciduous forest. From the end of the 19th century human activity has made major changes, removing timber and introducing coffee plantations. The original vegetation survives only in islands, mostly less than 1,000 hectares (2,500 acres). The protected area holds various types of cerrado vegetation including savannah, semi-deciduous and riparian forest, mostly in relatively good condition. The ARIE is home to mid-sized animals such as capybaras, deer and peccaries, as well as several rare or endangered species including the maned wolf (Chrysocyon brachyurus), cougar (Felis concolor), Tayra (Eira barbara) and giant anteater (Myrmecophaga tridactyla).

== Sources ==
- Arie Cerrado Pé-de-Gigante (in Portuguese), Chico Mendes Institute for Biodiversity Conservation
- Buriti de Vassununga (in Portuguese), ISA: Instituto Socioambiental
- Pivello, Vânia Regina; Bitencourt, Marisa Dantas; Mantovani, Waldir; Navarro de Mesquita, Humberto Junior; Batalha, Marco Antonio; Nagako Shida, Cláudia (1998), "PROPOSTA de Zoneamento Ecológico para a RESERVA DE Cerrado Pé-de-Gigante (Santa Rita do Passa Quatro, SP)" (PDF), Brazilian Journal of Ecology, 2 (2), Rio Claro, SP, Brazil, archived from the original (PDF) on 2016-06-03
- Unidade de Conservação: Área de Relevante Interesse Ecológico Pé-de-Gigante (in Portuguese), MMA: Ministério do Meio Ambiente
