= Jararaca =

Jararaca may refer to:

- Jararaca River, a river in Paraná state in southern Brazil
- several venomous pit viper species found in South America:
  - Bothrops jararaca
  - Bothrops neuwiedi, also known as jararaca pintada (literally in Portuguese: painted jararaca)
  - Bothrops bilineatus, also known as green jararaca
- Jararaca, a Brazilian actor
- EE-3 Jararaca, a Brazilian 4x4 armored vehicle
