= Mussurana montana =

Conservation status
- Least Concern (IUCN 3.1)

Scientific classification
- Kingdom: Animalia
- Phylum: Chordata
- Class: Reptilia
- Order: Squamata
- Suborder: Serpentes
- Family: Colubridae
- Genus: Mussurana
- Species: M. montana

Binomial name
- Mussurana montana Franco, Marques, & Puorto, 1997

Species of snake

Mussurana montana is a species of snake in the family Colubridae. The species is native to Brazil. Within the states of São Paulo, Minas Gerais and Espírito Santo it is categorized as Vulnerable and Near Threatened, respectively.
