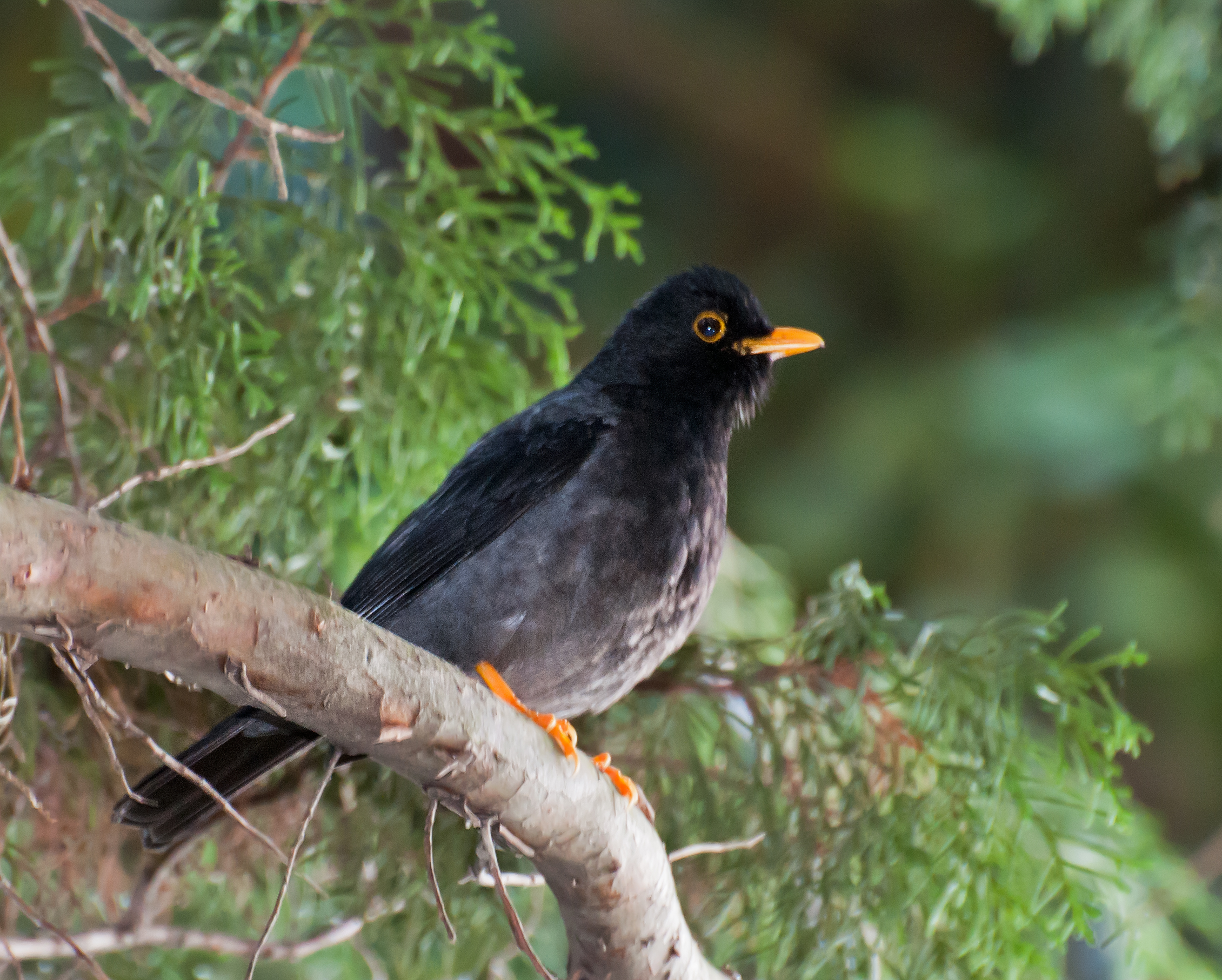
- Adult male in São Paulo, Brazil
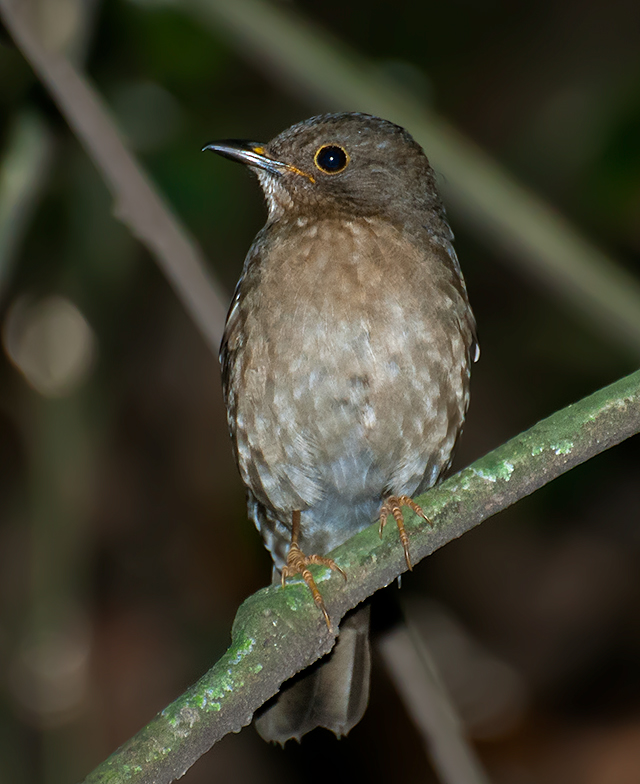
- Adult female in São Paulo, Brazil

Conservation status
- Least Concern (IUCN 3.1)

Scientific classification
- Kingdom: Animalia
- Phylum: Chordata
- Class: Aves
- Order: Passeriformes
- Family: Turdidae
- Genus: Turdus
- Species: T. flavipes

Binomial name
- Turdus flavipes Vieillot, 1818

= Yellow-legged thrush =

Species of bird

The yellow-legged thrush (Turdus flavipes) is a species of bird in the family Turdidae. It is found in Argentina, Brazil, Colombia, Guyana, Trinidad and Tobago, and Venezuela. It formerly occurred in Paraguay and has been recorded as a vagrant in Uruguay.

== Taxonomy and systematics ==
The creamy-bellied thrush was originally described in 1818 with its current binomial Turdus flavipes. For much of the twentieth century it was placed in genus Platycichla. However, following phylogenetic studies published in 2005 and 2007 taxonomic systems merged Platycichla into Turdus, returning the species to its original binomial.

The yellow-legged thrush has these five subspecies:

- T. f. venezuelensis (Sharpe, 1900)
- T. f. melanopleura (Sharpe, 1900)
- T. f. xanthoscelus Jardine, 1847
- T. f. polionotus (Sharpe, 1900)
- T. f. flavipes Vieillot, 1818

During part of the twentieth century what is now the pale-eyed thrush (T. leucops) was included as a sixth subspecies.

== Description ==
The yellow-legged thrush is 20 to 22 cm (7.9 to 8.7 in) long and weighs 55 to 72 g (1.9 to 2.5 oz). The species is sexually dimorphic. Adult males of the nominate subspecies T. f. flavipes have a black head, wings, tail, and breast. Their back, rump, flanks, belly, and vent are slate-gray. They have a yellow eye-ring, bill, legs, and feet. Adult females have a mostly warm darkish brown head, upperparts, wings, and tail. Their throat and underparts are a paler and more orangey brown. They have a yellowish eye-ring, a dull bill, and yellow legs and feet. Juvenile males are mostly slate-brown with black wings and tail; juvenile females resemble adults. Both sexes of juveniles have buffy-orange spots on their crown, nape, and back and buffy-orange spots and bars on their underparts.

The other subspecies of the yellow-legged thrush differ from the nominate and each other thus:

- T. f. venezuelensis: male is paler gray on mantle and belly, female has more olive upperparts
- T. f. melanopleura: male is variable but has more black especially on belly, female has duller underparts
- T. f. xanthoscelus: male is entirely black, female is like nominate
- T. f. polionotus: male is paler gray on mantle and belly like venezuelensis, female grayer on crown to tail than nominate

== Distribution and habitat ==
The yellow-legged thrush has a highly disjunct distribution. The subspecies are found thus:

- T. f. venezuelensis: in Venezuela, mountains in states of Falcón, Yaracuy and Bolívar; Coastal Range from Carabobo to eastern Miranda; and Andes from Lara; from last southwest into northeastern Colombia
- T. f. melanopleura: in Venezuela, mountains in Anzoátegui and northeastern Monagas and on Isla Margarita; Trinidad
- T. f. xanthoscelus: Tobago
- T. f. polionotus: Cerro Roraima in Venezuela; west-central Guyana; far northeastern Brazil
- T. f. flavipes: southeastern Brazil from northern Bahia south to northern Rio Grande do Sul with isolated records further north; historical records in northeastern Argentina's Misiones Province; formerly Paraguay and as a vagrant to Uruguay

The yellow-legged thrush inhabits the interior, edges, and clearings of humid primary and secondary forest and woodlands and also shade coffee plantations. In Venezuela it ranges in elevation between 480 and 2,500 m (1,600 and 8,200 ft) north of the Orinoco River, between 1,000 and 1,800 m (3,300 and 5,900 ft) south of it, and between 100 and 900 m (300 and 3,000 ft) on Isla Margarita. In southeastern Brazil it ranges from sea level to 2,000 m (6,600 ft) but is found only above 1,000 m (3,300 ft) in the north. It ranges between 350 and 1,800 m (1,100 and 5,900 ft) in Colombia.

== Behavior ==
=== Movement ===
The yellow-legged thrush is a partial migrant; however, some of its movements are not well understood. It is a year-round resident in most of its range. The southernmost population in Brazil moves north for the austral winter. It is thought to make some movements in Colombia but they are ill-defined and mostly undocumented. Similarly, some movements are suspected but poorly known in Venezuela.

=== Feeding ===
The yellow-legged thrush feeds mostly on fruit and also includes insects in its diet. It forages at all levels of the forest but seldom on the ground. It sometimes feeds in small groups in fruiting trees. It only occasionally joins mixed-species flocks.

=== Breeding ===
The yellow-legged thrush's breeding seasons have not been fully defined but are known to vary geographically. Its season in Colombia includes June, September, and December. It spans at least March to July on Trinidad and November to January in southeastern Brazil. In Venezuela it appears to breed during the first half of the year but details are lacking. The species' nest is a shallow cup made from roots and mud, covered with moss, and lined with rootlets. It typically is built in a niche in an earthen bank or a rock face, though one was found inside a bromeliad. The clutch is two eggs that are pale blue to greenish blue marked with reddish brown. The incubation period, time to fledging, and details of parental care are not known.

=== Vocalization ===
The yellow-legged thrush typically sings from the top of a tree. Its song varies widely among individual birds and it often mimics the songs of other species. One description of the song is a "short series (2-8 notes) at 1-sec intervals, like wioh-wir wee or fee-tje-wee fee-tje-wee, many with sharp, [extremely] high sjee overtones". The series are "loud and energetic, but often rather squeaky". Its calls include "tsrip, [a] typical turdine cluck, [and a] strange seeeet in alarm".

== Status ==
The IUCN has assessed the yellow-legged thrush as being of Least Concern. It has a large range; its population size is not known and is believed to be stable. No immediate threats have been identified. It is considered "frequent to uncommon" in southeastern Brazil and rare in the north. It is considered fairly common in Venezuela.
