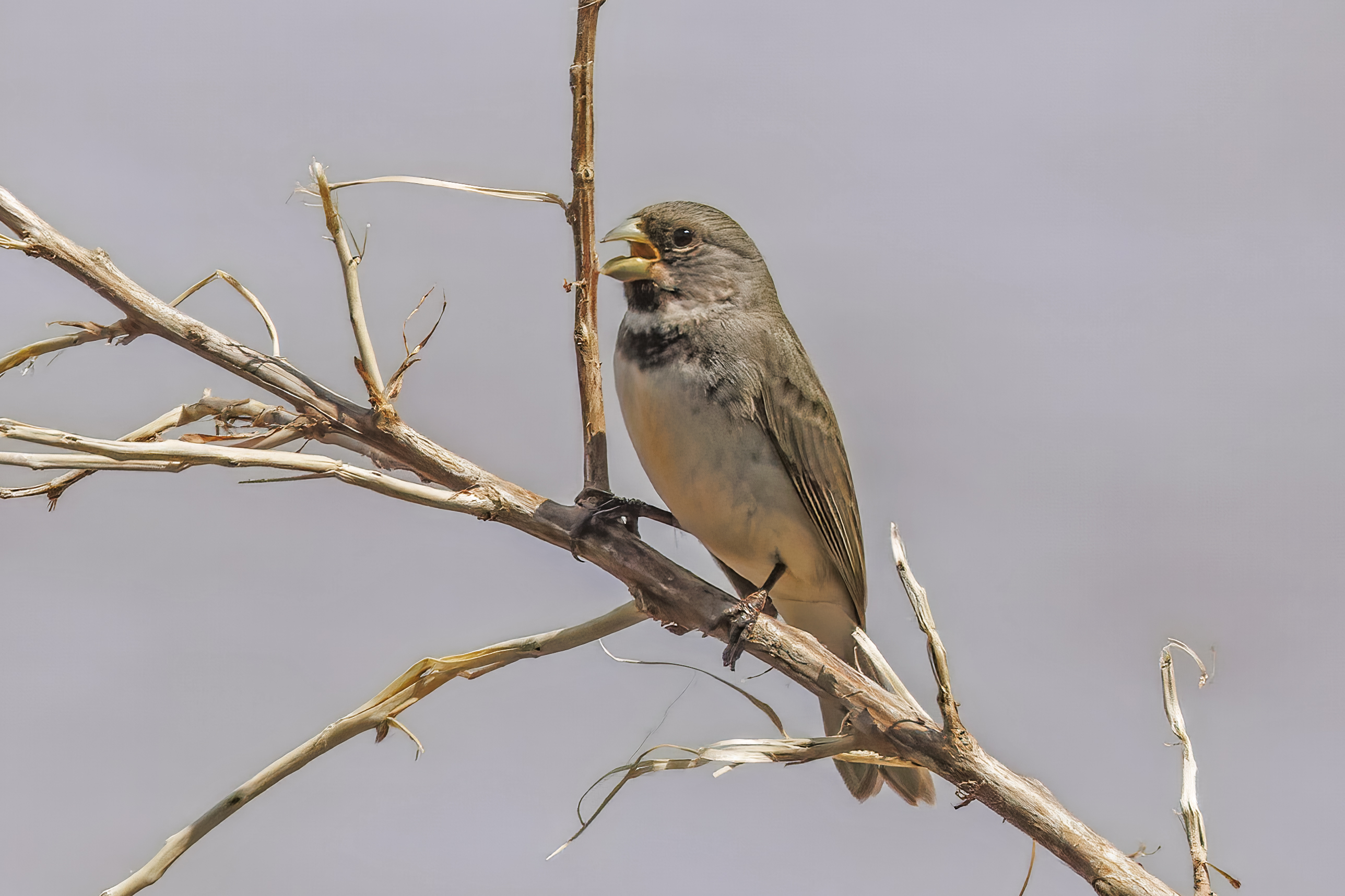
- Male in Uruguay
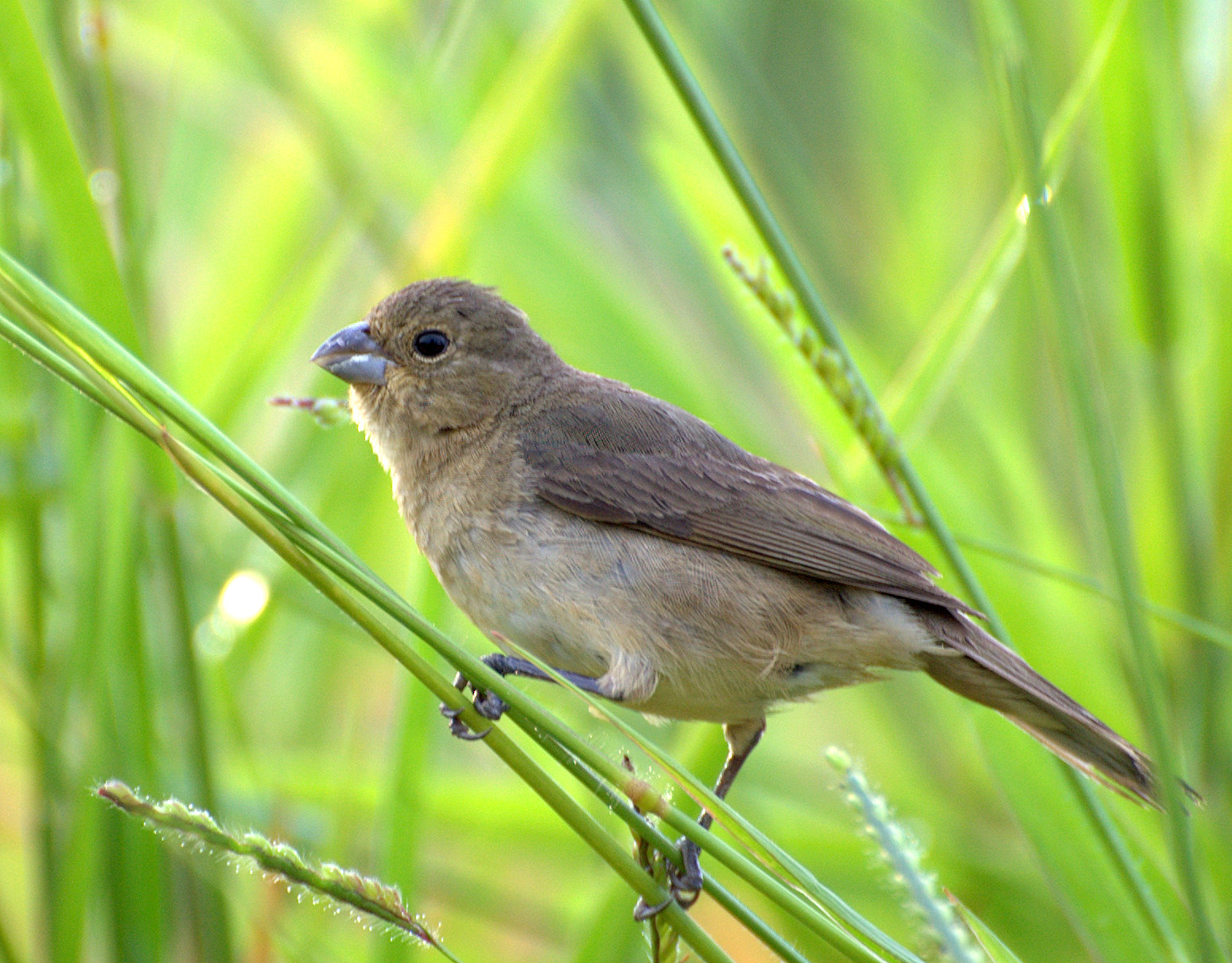
- Female

Conservation status
- Least Concern (IUCN 3.1)

Scientific classification
- Kingdom: Animalia
- Phylum: Chordata
- Class: Aves
- Order: Passeriformes
- Family: Thraupidae
- Genus: Sporophila
- Species: S. caerulescens

Binomial name
- Sporophila caerulescens (Vieillot, 1823)

= Double-collared seedeater =

Species of bird

The double-collared seedeater (Sporophila caerulescens) is a species of bird in the family Thraupidae, the tanagers and allies. It is found in Argentina, Bolivia, Brazil, Colombia, Paraguay, Peru, Uruguay, and as a vagrant in Chile.

== Taxonomy and systematics ==
The double-collared seedeater has a complicated taxonomic history. It was formally described in 1823 with the binomial Pyrrhula caerulescens. By 1938 it had been reassigned to its present genus Sporophila, which at the time was a member of the family Fringillidae. By 1970 Sporophila had been reassigned to the family Emberizidae. Based on studies published between 1988 and 2011, beginning in 2012 the genus was moved to its present position in the tanager family Thraupidae.

The double-collared seedeater has these three subspecies:

- S. c. caerulescens (Vieillot, 1823)
- S. c. hellmayri Wolters, 1939
- S. c. yungae Gyldenstolpe, 1941

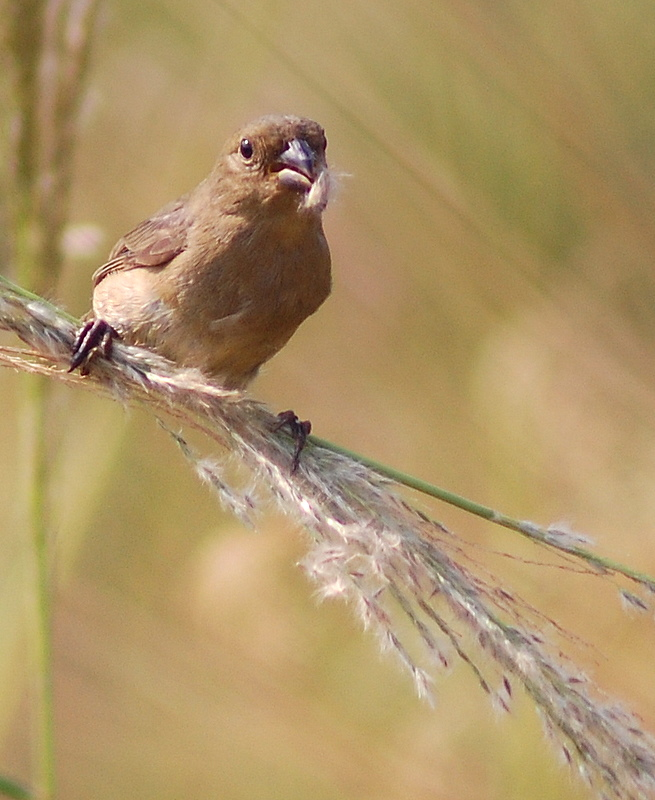
Female

== Description ==
The double-collared seedeater is about 11 cm (4.3 in) long and weighs 7.4 to 12.5 g (0.26 to 0.44 oz). It has a short thick bill with a rounded culmen. The species is sexually dimorphic. Adult males of the nominate subspecies S. c. caerulescens have a mostly lead-gray head with an almost black forehead and a thin white crescent under the eye. They also have an almost black "moustache" with white below it. Their upperparts and tail are olive-brown and their wings grayish olive. Their upper throat is black and their lower throat white with a blackish band below the latter. Their underparts are mostly whitish with dark gray sides on the breast and gray spots on the flanks. Adult females have a warm buffy brown head, nape, upperparts, wings, and tail. Their throat is pale, their breast, flanks, and crissum warm buffy brown, and their belly and vent paler buff. Juveniles resemble adult females. Males of subspecies S. c. yungae have a paler head than the nominate with blackish only on the lores and a grayish crown and nape. S. c. hellmayri males have more black on their face than the nominate. Both sexes of all subspecies have a dark brown iris and blackish legs. Males have a yellowish to grayish bill and females a dark maxilla and yellowish horn mandible.

== Distribution and habitat ==
The nominate subspecies of the double-collared seedeater is the most northerly of the three and has by far the largest range. It is found in eastern Peru from southern Loreto Department south though Madre de Dios Department. Its range continues south through eastern and southeastern Bolivia and Paraguay into Argentina as far as Mendoza, La Pampa and east-central Buenos Aires provinces. From Peru, Bolivia, Paraguay, and Argentina its range continues east across extreme southeastern Colombia and Brazil south of a line roughly from western Amazonas to north-central Pará, then southeast to Espirito Santo and also across Uruguay. Subspecies S. c. yungae is found in the west-central Bolivian departments of La Paz, southern Beni, and Cochabamba. S. c. hellmayri is found along the Atlantic in Brazil from southern Bahia north to Rio Grande do Norte.

In addition, the South American Classification Committee has records of the species as a vagrant in Chile and on the Falkland Islands.

The double-collared seedeater inhabits somewhat open landscapes including the edges of forest and shrubby openings within it, young secondary forest, cerrado, agricultural lands, and towns. It is rarely found in large grasslands. In Brazil it ranges in elevation from sea level to 1,200 m (3,900 ft) and reaches 1,000 m (3,300 ft) in Peru.

== Behavior ==
=== Movement ===
The double-collared seedeater is a partial migrant, though details of its breeding, year-round, and wintering ranges are incomplete. One source says the species is a year-round resident from a line approximately from Tucumán Province in Argentina east to the Atlantic in Brazil's Santa Catarina state north to a line approximately from western La Paz in Bolivia to southern Tocantins in Brazil, and includes the Brazilian "Atlantic extension". However, another source includes Rio Grande do Sul south of Santa Catarina; the two agree on the northern limit. The species breeds but does not winter south of the southern line and winters but does not breed north of the northern line.

=== Feeding ===
The double-collared seedeater feeds primarily on grass seeds, including those of introduced species. It forages both when clinging to grass stems and on the ground. In the breeding season it usually forages singly or in pairs; outside that time it forms small flocks.

=== Breeding ===
The double-collared seedeater breeds between December and May in southern Brazil and mostly between October and February elsewhere. In the northern part of its year-round range it possibly breeds at any time of year. Its nest is a cup made from grass roots and spider web placed in a shrub, tree, or other vegetation. It is often placed within about 0.5 m (1.6 ft) of the ground but some have been found as high as 6 m (20 ft). The clutch is two eggs in the northern part of its range and three in the south. They are whitish, cream, or very pale green with dark markings. The female alone incubates, for about 13 days, and fledging occurs 12 to 15 days after hatch. Both parents provision nestlings.

=== Vocalization ===
The double-collared seedeater's song is "loud and varied, composed of variable and jumbled notes...jew, jitit-jew-jew, jitit or jewle, jewle, jewle, jewle-jéé-jewlo, jewlo-tshrr". There is much variation across the species' range. Its calls are tslit or tsri.

== Status ==
The IUCN has assessed the double-collared seedeater as being of Least Concern. It has an extrelely large range; its population size is not known but is believed to be increasing. No immediate threats have been identified. It is considered "common to frequent" in the appropriate season in Brazil and "fairly common" in winter in Peru. "This species’ preference for forest edge, second growth and similar areas perhaps means that suitable habitat for it is increasing as forest becomes ever more fragmented." However, it is a popular cage bird, and the " impact of trapping needs to be kept in mind with regard to the species’ numerical status".
