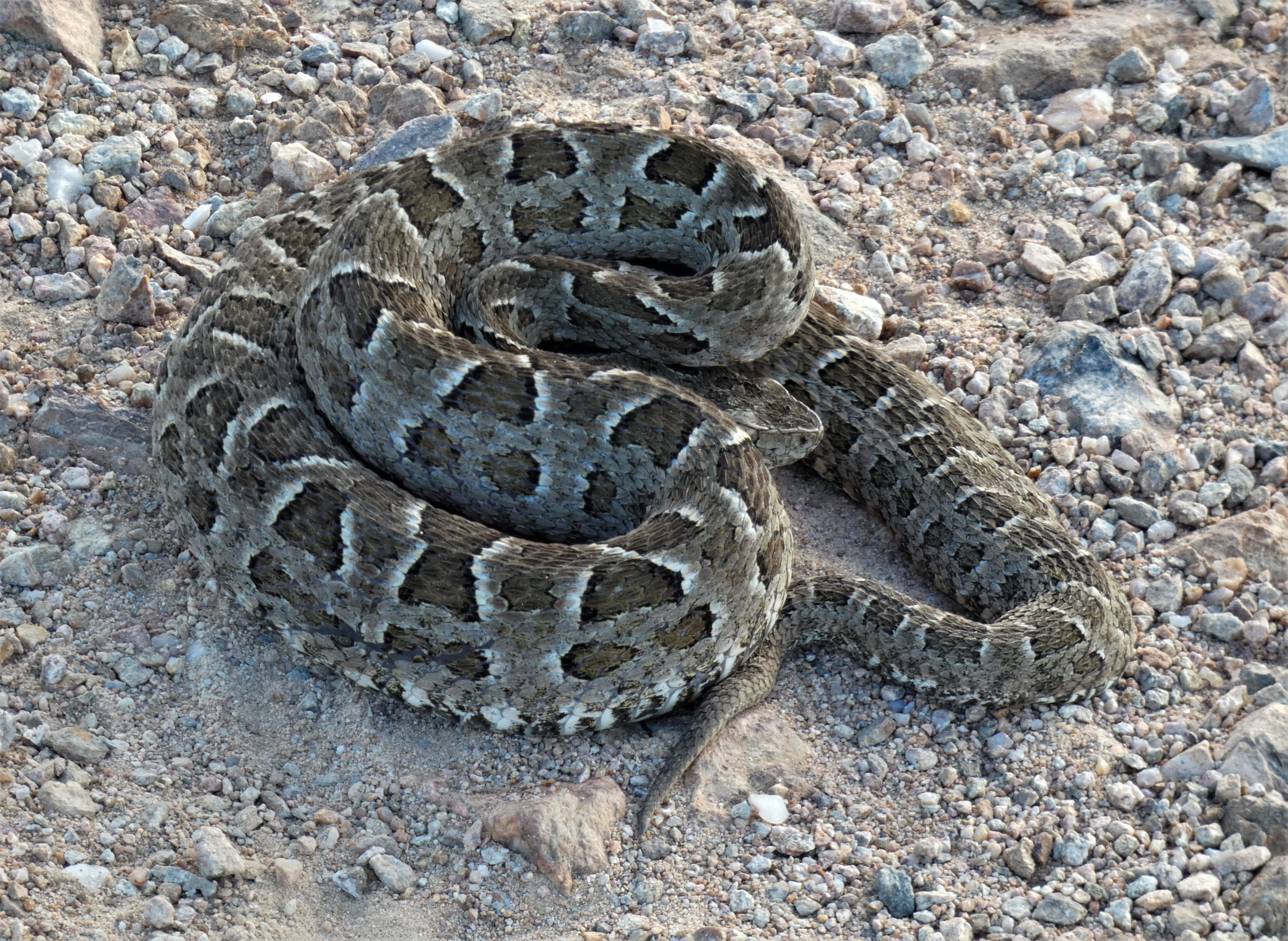

Scientific classification
- Domain: Eukaryota
- Kingdom: Animalia
- Phylum: Chordata
- Class: Reptilia
- Order: Squamata
- Suborder: Serpentes
- Family: Viperidae
- Genus: Bothrops
- Species: B. pubescens

Binomial name
- Bothrops pubescens (Cope, 1870)

Synonyms
- Trigonocephalus pubescens; Bothrops neuwiedi riograndensis; Bothrops neuwiedi pubescens; Bothropoides pubescens

= Bothrops pubescens =

Species of snake

Bothrops pubescens is a species of venomous snake in the family Viperidae. It is found in Brazil and Uruguay. Its diet is comprised small mammals (56.2 percent of individual prey found), anurans (21.2%), lizards (7.5%), and birds (5.0%). Their prey to predator mass ratio ranges from 0.002 to 0.627. They tend to live in disturbed areas and mainly those close to forest.
