= Amphisbaena sanctaeritae =

Scientific classification
- Kingdom: Animalia
- Phylum: Chordata
- Class: Reptilia
- Order: Squamata
- Clade: Amphisbaenia
- Family: Amphisbaenidae
- Genus: Amphisbaena
- Species: A. sanctaeritae

Binomial name
- Amphisbaena sanctaeritae Vanzolini, 1994

Species of lizard

Amphisbaena sanctaeritae is a species of amphisbaenian in the family Amphisbaenidae. The species is endemic to Brazil.

== Etymology ==
The specific name, sanctaeritae, refers to the type locality, Santa Rita do Passa Quatro.

== Geographic range ==
A. sanctaeritae is found in the Brazilian State of São Paulo.

== Reproduction ==
A. sanctaeritae is oviparous.
