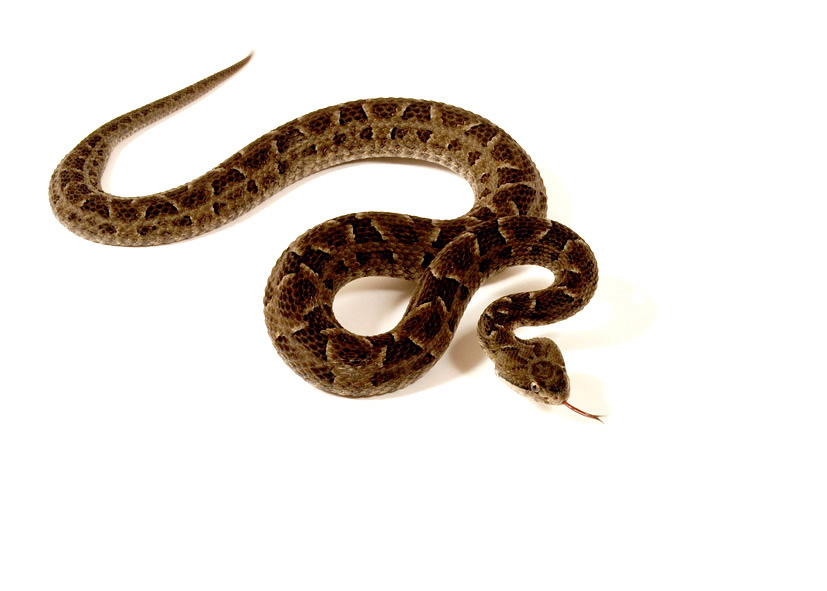

Conservation status
- Least Concern (IUCN 3.1)

Scientific classification
- Kingdom: Animalia
- Phylum: Chordata
- Class: Reptilia
- Order: Squamata
- Suborder: Serpentes
- Family: Viperidae
- Genus: Bothrops
- Species: B. diporus

Binomial name
- Bothrops diporus Cope, 1862

= Bothrops diporus =

Species of viper

Bothrops diporus, also known in Portuguese as Bocuda, Cabeça-de-Capanga, Jararaca-do-Chaco, Jararaca-do-Rabo-Branco, Jararaca-Pintada, Jararaca-Pintada-Argentina and Jararaca-Pintada-do-Sul, is a species of viper from the forests of Argentina, Brazil, Paraguay and Bolivia. As with all vipers, it is venomous.

== Description ==
Bothrops diporus is identifiable by its dark pattern, which consists mainly of fused dark triangular markings on a lighter base colour, similar to that of B. ayerbei with the two rounded dark blotches at the base of each triangle.

Bothrops diporus have been sighted at a length of around 70–80 cm (28–31 in).

== Diet ==
Bothrops diporus has been sighted partaking in ophiophagy of Chironius maculoventris and Epictia albipuncta, however it is known for its largely mammalian diet, including rodents, frogs and lizards.

=== Venom ===
Bothrops diporus is one of the main causes of snakebite in Argentina: between 1960 and 1975, according to Esteso (1985), 80% of the approximately 500 cases reported each year were attributed to this species.

== Habitat ==
Bothrops diporus has been found in the Vermejo River region, on the boundary of Paraguay and Argentina.

== Reproduction ==
Bothrops diporus reproduces sexually and is ovoviviparous.
