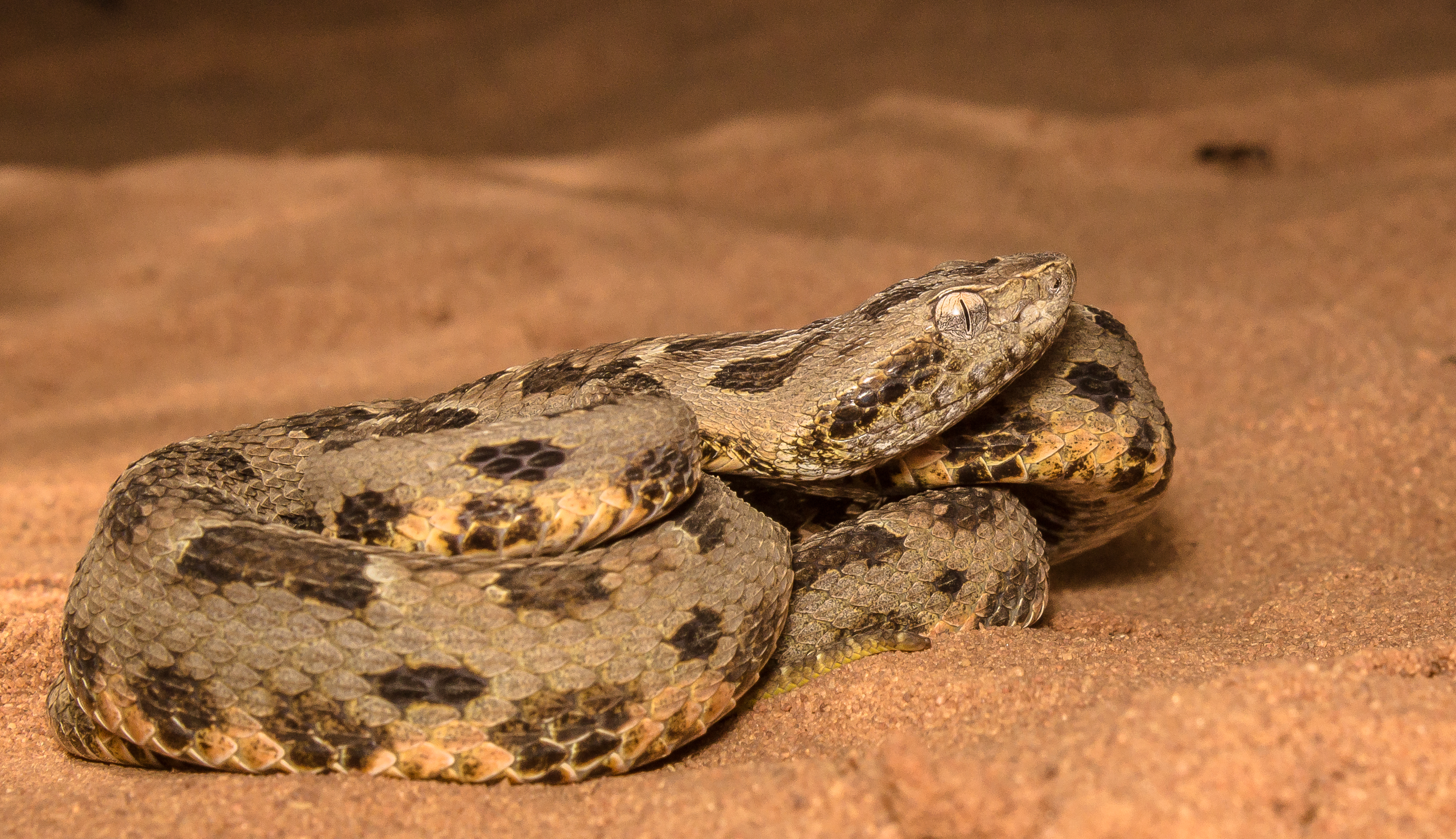

Scientific classification
- Kingdom: Animalia
- Phylum: Chordata
- Class: Reptilia
- Order: Squamata
- Suborder: Serpentes
- Family: Viperidae
- Genus: Bothrops
- Species: B. pauloensis

Binomial name
- Bothrops pauloensis Amaral, 1925

= Bothrops pauloensis =

Species of snake

Bothrops pauloensis is a species of pit viper from Brazil, Paraguay and Bolivia - most commonly Cerrado. It is named specifically after São Paulo. As with all vipers, it is Venomous.

== Description ==
Bothrops pauloensis displays stripes on the sides of its head behind the eyes as well as 11 to 25 blotches along the sides of its body. The colouration is highly variable, but it is often cream with black blotches. The placement of the blotches is also variable, but they are often distanced from each other.

== Venom ==
The venom of Bothrops pauloensis has been researched for its toxins' possible therapeutic effects.

Toxin	Effects
C-type lectin	Bactericidal
LAAO	Antiplatelet Antitumoral Bactericidal Leishmanicidal
Metalloproteinases	Antiangiogenic Antiplatelet Fibrinogenolytic
Phospholipase	Antiplatelet Antitumoral Bactericidal Leishmanicidal
Serine proteinase	Defibrinating

== Habitat ==
Bothrops pauloensis is often in high altitude areas at 200–500 m (660–1,640 ft) with a high humidity and low temperature.

== Reproduction ==
Bothrops pauloensis reproduces sexually and is ovoviviparous.
