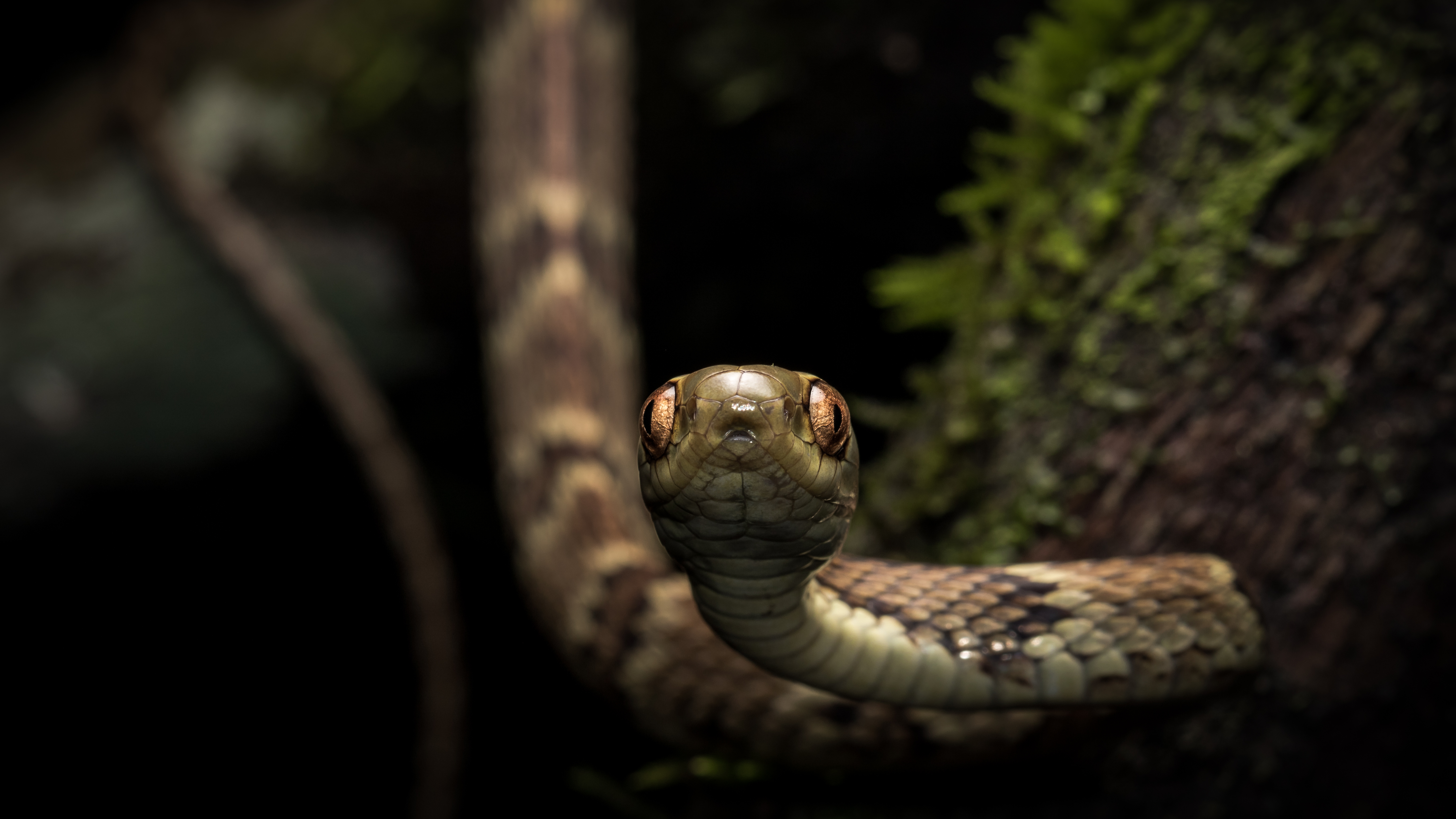

Conservation status
- Least Concern (IUCN 3.1)

Scientific classification
- Kingdom: Animalia
- Phylum: Chordata
- Class: Reptilia
- Order: Squamata
- Suborder: Serpentes
- Family: Colubridae
- Genus: Dipsas
- Species: D. albifrons

Binomial name
- Dipsas albifrons (Sauvage, 1884)

= Dipsas albifrons =

Species of snake

Dipsas albifrons, Sauvage's snail-eater, is a non-venomous snake found in Brazil.
