= Ilha da Queimada Grande =

Island off the coast of Brazil

Nickname: Snake Island
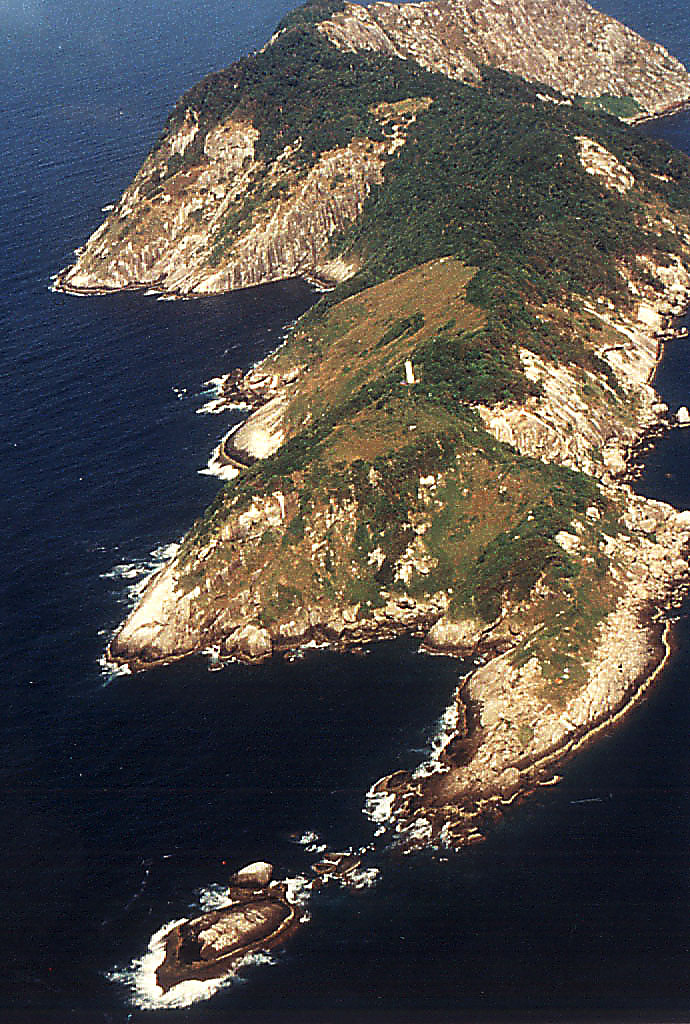
- Aerial view of Ilha da Queimada Grande

- Location within Brazil
- Interactive map of Ilha da Queimada Grande

Geography
- Location: Atlantic Ocean
- Coordinates: 24°29′10″S 46°40′30″W
- Area: 430,000 m^{2} (4,600,000 sq ft)
- Highest elevation: 206 m (676 ft)

Administration
- Brazil
- State: State of São Paulo
- Municipality: Itanhaém
- Administered by: Chico Mendes Institute for Biodiversity Conservation

Demographics
- Population: 0

Ilha da Queimada Grande, more commonly referred to as Snake Island, is an island off the coast of Brazil in the Atlantic Ocean. It has become famous for its abundance of snakes, hence its common name. The island, which has a land area of 43 hectares (106 acres), is administered as part of the municipality of Itanhaém in the State of São Paulo. It has a temperate climate, and its terrain varies from bare rock to rainforest.

Snake Island is the only natural home of the critically endangered, venomous golden lancehead pit viper (Bothrops insularis), whose diet consists of birds. The snakes became trapped on the island thousands of years ago, following the end of the last ice age, when rising ocean levels disconnected the island from the mainland. The ensuing evolutionary pressure allowed the snakes to adapt to their new environment, increasing rapidly in population and rendering the island dangerous to public visitation.

Queimada Grande is closed to the public for the protection of both people and snakes; access is available only to the Brazilian Navy and selected researchers vetted by the Chico Mendes Institute for Biodiversity Conservation, the Brazilian federal conservation unit.

== Geography ==
Located approximately 33 kilometres (21 mi) off the coast of the state of São Paulo, Brazil, the island of Queimada Grande is approximately 430,000 square metres (106 acres) in area and ranges in elevation from 0 to 206 metres (676 ft) above sea level. It has a temperate climate that is similar to that of its neighbouring island Nimer. Rainforest covers 0.25 square kilometres (62 acres) of the island, with the remaining area consisting of barren rocks and open grassland. Queimada Grande ranges from an average of 18.38 °C (65.08 °F) in August to 27.28 °C (81.10 °F) in March, and rainfall ranges from 0.2 millimetres (0.0079 in) per month in July to 135.2 millimetres (5.32 in) in December.

== History ==
Ilha da Queimada Grande partly consists of barren rock, a result of deforestation, which is the origin of the island's name: the term queimada is Portuguese for "forest fire", due to historical attempts by locals to clear land for a banana plantation by burning. A lighthouse was constructed in 1909 to steer ships away from the island, and the last human inhabitants left when the lighthouse was automated in the 1920s.

The island and the Ilha Queimada Pequena to the west are protected by the 33 hectares (82 acres) Ilhas Queimada Pequena e Queimada Grande Area of Relevant Ecological Interest, created in 1985. The Brazilian Navy has closed the island to the public to protect human and snake life. The only people allowed on the island are research teams who receive waivers to collect data.

== Fauna ==
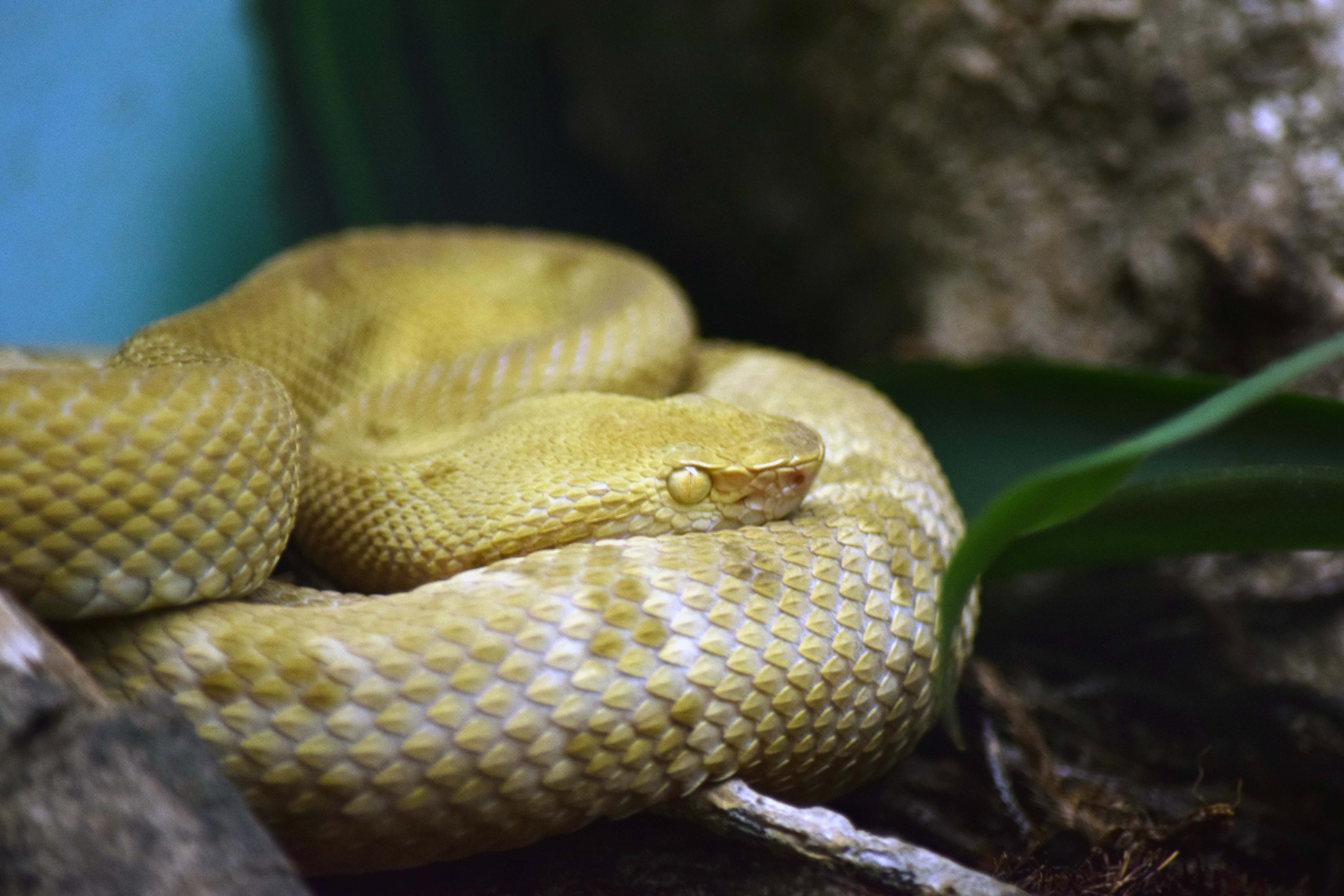
The critically endangered golden lancehead (Bothrops insularis)

The island was previously thought to have a population of about 430,000 snakes, but recent estimates are much lower. The first systematic study of the population of the golden lancehead (Bothrops insularis), which lives exclusively on Queimada Grande, found the number to be 2,000 to 4,000, concentrated almost entirely in the rainforest area of the island. This may be due to a limited amount of resources. Despite a population of 41 recorded bird species on Queimada Grande, the golden lancehead preys on only two: the southern house wren (Troglodytes musculus) and the Chilean elaenia (Elaenia chilensis). The golden lancehead is categorized as critically endangered on the IUCN Red List of Threatened Species. The island is also home to a smaller population of Dipsas albifrons, a non-venomous snake species.
