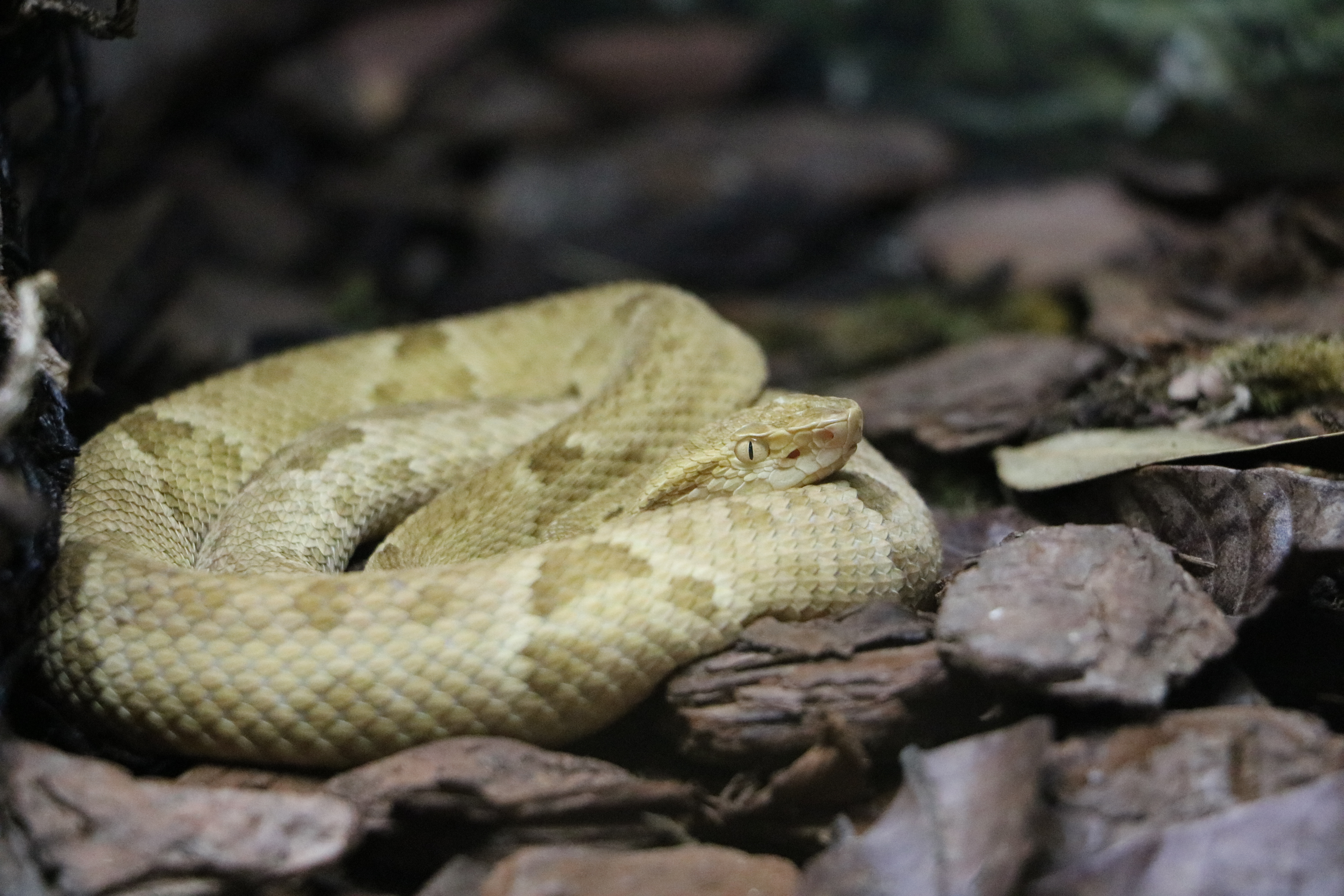

Conservation status
- Critically Endangered (IUCN 3.1)

Scientific classification
- Kingdom: Animalia
- Phylum: Chordata
- Class: Reptilia
- Order: Squamata
- Suborder: Serpentes
- Family: Viperidae
- Genus: Bothrops
- Species: B. insularis

Binomial name
- Bothrops insularis (Amaral, 1922)

Synonyms
- Lachesis insularis Amaral, 1922; Bothrops insularis – Amaral, 1930; Bothrops insularis – Golay et al., 1993

= Golden lancehead =

Species of snake

The golden lancehead (Bothrops insularis) is an extremely venomous pit viper species in the subfamily Crotalinae of the family Viperidae. The species is found exclusively on the island of Ilha da Queimada Grande, off the coast of São Paulo state, in Brazil. The common name of the species refers to the light yellowish-brown color of its underside and for its lance-like head shape that is characteristic of the genus Bothrops. No subspecies of B. insularis are recognized as being valid. It is one of the most venomous snakes in Latin America.

== Physical morphology ==
=== Size and appearance ===
Usually, B. insularis grows to a total length (including tail) of 70 to 90 cm (28 to 35 in), but it is known to reach a total length of 118 cm (46 in). Its color pattern consists of a pale yellowish-brown ground color, overlaid with a series of dorsal blotches that may be triangular or quadrangular, broad or narrow, and alternating or opposite along the dorsal median. In captivity, this yellowish color often becomes darker, which may be the result of poor circulation caused by ineffective thermoregulation. A banded pattern results when the pattern is opposite. The head lacks a well-defined postorbital stripe. The belly is a uniform pale yellow or cream. The name "lancehead" refers to the distinctive head shape of all snakes in the genus Bothrops, which is somewhat elongated and comes to a point at the nose. B. insularis also has a longer tail than its closest relative, B. jararaca, which is most likely an adaptation to help the snake maneuver through the trees, and to eat larger prey, such as birds, from a younger age.

=== Venom ===
Because of the isolated habitat of B. insularis, and the lack of mammal prey species, the venom of B. insularis has evolved to be adapted to the prey species of the island, primarily native ectotherms, arthropods, and migrating birds. As a result, its venom is more potent towards these groups than mammals, and becomes more potent as the snake matures. Chemical analysis of the venom of B. insularis suggests that it is five times as potent as that of B. jararaca and is the fastest-acting venom in the genus Bothrops.

Because B. insularis is only found in an area uninhabited by humans, an official report of a human being bitten by one has not been made, but other lanceheads are responsible for more human mortality than any other group of snakes in either North or South America. Ludwig Trutnau reports four human envenomations, three of which were fatal. The mortality rate for lancehead envenomations is 0.5–3.0% if the patient receives treatment and 7.0% if the patient does not receive treatment. The effects of envenomations by golden lanceheads include swelling, local pain, nausea and vomiting, blood blisters, bruising, blood in the vomit and urine, intestinal bleeding, kidney failure, hemorrhage in the brain, and severe necrosis of muscular tissue.

== Reproduction ==
Sexually mature B. insularis snakes mate during August and September, and have been known to mate both in the trees and on the ground. Like most vipers, B. insularis gives live birth to its young. The average number of golden lancehead young per gravidity is 6.5. No data are published for the size of the golden lancehead at birth, but newborns are probably of a similar size to B. jararaca, the neonates of which have a snout-to-vent length of 24.5 to 25.3 cm (9 3/4 to 10 in) and a weight of 9.38 to 10.61 g (about 1/3 oz).

Owing to the dependence of B. insularis on migratory birds visiting the island as a food source, the reproductive cycle of female snakes has been suggested to be tied to seasonal bird migration patterns.

== Geographic range ==
B. insularis is endemic to Queimada Grande Island, Brazil, commonly known as Snake Island. Therefore, the type locality is the same: "Ilha da Queimada Grande, situado no litoral do Estado de S. Paulo, a cêrca de 40 milhas a S.O. da barra de Santos " (Brazil). This island has a total area of only 43 hectares (430,000 m^{2}; 110 acres; 0.17 sq mi). Travel to the island is strictly prohibited by the Brazilian government.

== Habitat ==
The island of Queimada Grande, to which B. insularis is endemic, is classified as "subtropical" or "tropical moist forest". The coordinates for the island are 24°29′S 46°40′W. The island contains several different kinds of habitat, including forest, clearings, and shrubs. The island has a very mild climate; the temperature never falls below 18 °C (64 °F), and at its hottest is just over 22 °C (72 °F). Because of the extremely rocky terrain and the isolation of the island, however, the island is not easily accessible and is not populated by humans, or for that matter, any other mammal. The quality of its habitat continues to decline due to vegetation removal by members of the Brazilian Navy, which maintains the lighthouse on the island.

=== Microhabitat preferences ===
B. insularis can usually be found either in the trees hunting for its prey or seeking shelter among leaf litter or in rock crevices, especially during unfavorable weather or after having just ingested its prey.

== Taxonomy and evolution ==
A 2005 genetic study found that the golden lancehead was nested within the living genetic diversity of B. jararaca, a snake native to southern Brazil, Paraguay, and northern Argentina. The golden lancehead is thought to descend from a population of B. jararaca that became isolated on Queimada Grande, which was connected to the South American mainland during the last glacial period, after a major sea-level rise at the beginning of the Holocene. Including B. insularis and B. jararaca, 37 species are placed in the genus Bothrops, which are all native to South America. Besides "lancehead", another common name for a snake in the genus Bothrops is "fer-de-lance". No mammals are native to the island Queimada Grande, which has undoubtedly had a profound impact on the evolution of the golden lancehead.

== Ecology ==
=== Predators ===
In Campbell and Lamar's 2004 accounts of the venomous reptiles of Latin America, no mention was made of any predators that could potentially prey on an adults of B. insularis, but the list of animal species provided by Duarte et al. includes several species of birds, spiders, millipedes, and various lizards that inhabit the island, which could potentially be predators of young snakes. Of course, Duarte et al. also stress that a lack of observation of this species exists, due to the inaccessibility of the island, and that just because a relationship between B. insularis and other species has not been observed does not mean that such a relationship does not exist.

=== Prey ===
The golden lancehead's diet consists mostly of perching birds. It has been reported to eat lizards, though, and may even resort to cannibalism. Newborn and juvenile golden lanceheads prey primarily upon invertebrates. Adults of B. insularis are able to survive on only one or two birds species per year of the more than 40 that visit the island.

=== Competition ===
B. insularis is the only animal on the island of Queimada Grande to have been reported to eat birds. Other fauna, such as frogs, lizards, and birds, on the island eat invertebrates, but because insects are so plentiful in ecosystems, they may not be a limiting resource. Therefore, studies would have to be done to determine whether or not juvenile and newborn golden lanceheads must compete for food with other fauna.

=== Parasites ===
The golden lancehead is known to suffer from flukes (specifically Ochetosoma heterocoelium) in its mouth cavity, as well as to carry the hard-bodied tick Amblyomma rotundatum.

=== Conservation status ===
This species B. insularis is classified as critically endangered on the IUCN Red List for the following criteria: CR B1ab(iii)+2ab(iii) (v3.1 (2001). This means that the "geographic range" is estimated to be less than 100 km^{2} (39 sq mi), that this area is severely fragmented or known to exist at only a single location, and that a continuing decline has been observed, inferred, or projected for the area, extent, and/or quality of the habitat. Furthermore, the "area of occupancy" is estimated to be less than 10 km^{2} (3.9 sq mi). The population trend was stable when assessed in 2004. The population of B. insularis on the island was estimated in 2021, based on a combination of observations and two- and three-dimensional scanning of the island in 2015, to be between 2,414 (2D scan estimate) and 2,899 (3D scan estimate).

=== Limited geographic distribution ===
Because the island on which the species is found is small, it can support only a small population, suggesting that the range between the number of snakes required for the population to survive and the maximum number the island can support is small, making the species especially sensitive to any other problems. Also, because the island of Queimada Grande is the only place where B. insularis is found in the wild, if that population is wiped out, the species will be extinct in the wild.

=== Habitat destruction and overcollecting ===
In the past, people have deliberately started fires on the island in an attempt to kill off B. insularis, so that the island could be used to grow bananas. The Brazilian Navy has also contributed to habitat destruction by removing vegetation to maintain a lighthouse on the island. Because of these problems, as well as overharvesting by overzealous scientists, Duarte et al. wrote that it is "very hazardous to assume that this is an invulnerable snake". Based on a 100-year simulation, between an estimated 25 and 40 snakes harvested per year would cause genetic extinction for B. insularis. Collection of this species of snake is permitted only with a scientific collection permit.

In addition to authorized collecting for research purposes, the illegal wildlife trade is a threat to B. insularis due to its rare nature, with researchers approached with offers of up to $30,000 for specimens in 2008, nearly four times Brazil's GDP per capita that year.

=== Reproductive health and intersexes ===
Due to the small population and limited geographic distribution of B. insularis, a high level of inbreeding occurs in the in situ population on the island. This threatens to produce deleterious genes in the population and is associated with extinction when inbreeding depression occurs in the population. Diversity management may be needed in the future for in situ and ex situ populations maintained off the island for research to avoid extinction.

Associated with the heavy inbreeding of B. insularis is the occurrence of "intersexes", individuals born with both a hemipenis and female reproductive parts. Duarte et al. attribute these intersexes to "a great amount of inbreeding" within the population (which is another effect of the species's small distribution) and explain that the relatively high occurrence of intersexes being born may be harmful to the species population, since most of the intersexes are sterile.

In addition to intersexes, when compared to its mainland relative B. jaracara, B. insularis has been found with reduced fecundity in females, and high levels of mutations in male sperm, thought to be a product of heavy inbreeding.

=== Loss of food sources ===
As of 2019, snake expert Bryan Fry reported in an interview with 60 Minutes Australia that the migratory birds upon which B. insularis depends were visiting less due to deforestation on the Brazilian mainland.

== Behavior ==
B. insularis may be either terrestrial or arboreal, though it lacks a true prehensile tail. Observations suggest that the species's use of vegetation is facultative (optional) and that it is not truly arboreal. It is likely to be found in trees while hunting for its prey, which consists mostly of birds, but it tends to seek shelter under leaf litter or in rock crevices during storms or after ingesting prey.

Unlike other venomous snakes that tend to strike, release, and then track their prey, B. insularis keeps its prey in its mouth once it has been envenomated. This is thought to be an adaptation to hunting birds, as chemical tracking of prey after release—a practice used by other vipers—is much harder when airborne food sources are to be tracked.

While other lanceheads have been observed shaking their tails to lure prey, this behavior has not been observed in the golden lancehead. Considering the presence of potential prey susceptible to caudal luring, though, and the opportunistic nature of B. insularis, observing this behavior would not be surprising.
