= List of Ig Nobel Prize winners =

Winners of satirical science award

A parody of the Nobel Prizes, the Ig Nobel Prizes are awarded each year in mid-September, around the time the recipients of the genuine Nobel Prizes are announced, for ten achievements that "first make people laugh, and then make them think". Commenting on the 2006 awards, Marc Abrahams, editor of Annals of Improbable Research and co-sponsor of the awards, said that "[t]he prizes are intended to celebrate the unusual, honor the imaginative, and spur people's interest in science, medicine, and technology". All prizes are awarded for real achievements, except for three in 1991 and one in 1994, due to an erroneous press release.

== 1991 ==
The awards were presented on 3 October. Each winner received a medal shaped like a frying pan that made a screaming noise when shaken and Cambridge parking passes that were valid from 3 a.m. – 4 a.m. the day after Christmas.

- Biology: Robert Klark Graham for his development of the Repository for Germinal Choice, a sperm bank that accepts donations only from Nobel laureates and Olympians.
- Chemistry: Jacques Benveniste, prolific proselytizer and dedicated correspondent of Nature, for his persistent "discovery" that water, H_{2}O, is an intelligent liquid, and for demonstrating to his satisfaction that water is able to remember events long after all traces of those events have vanished (see water memory, his proposed explanation for homeopathy).
- Economics: Michael Milken, father of the junk bond.
- Education: US vice president at the time Dan Quayle, "consumer of time and occupier of space" for demonstrating, better than anyone else, the need for science education.
- Literature: Erich von Däniken, visionary raconteur and author of Chariots of the Gods?, for explaining how human civilization was influenced by ancient astronauts from outer space.
- Medicine: Alan Kligerman, "deviser of digestive deliverance, vanquisher of vapor", and inventor of Beano, for his pioneering work with anti-gas liquids that prevent bloat, gassiness, discomfort, and embarrassment.
- Peace: Edward Teller, father of the hydrogen bomb and first champion of the Star Wars weapons system, "for his lifelong efforts to change the meaning of peace as we know it".

=== Apocryphal achievements ===
The first nomination also featured three fictional recipients for fictional achievements.

- Interdisciplinary Research: Josiah S. Carberry of Brown University for his work in psychoceramics, the study of "cracked pots".
- Pedestrian Technology: Paul DeFanti, "wizard of structures and crusader for public safety, for his invention of the Buckybonnet, a geodesic fashion structure that pedestrians wear to protect their heads and preserve their composure".
- Physics: Thomas Kyle, for his discovery of "the heaviest element in the universe, Administratium".

== 1992 ==
- Archaeology: Éclaireurs de France (a French Scouting organization), removers of graffiti, for damaging the prehistoric paintings of two bisons in the Cave of Mayrière supérieure near the French village of Bruniquel.
- Art: Presented jointly to Jim Knowlton for his anatomy poster "Penises of the Animal Kingdom," and to the U.S. National Endowment for the Arts for encouraging Mr. Knowlton to extend his work in the form of a pop-up book.
- Biology: Dr Cecil Jacobson, relentlessly generous sperm donor and prolific patriarch of sperm banking, for devising a simple, single-handed method of "quality control".
- Chemistry: Ivette Bassa, constructor of colourful colloids, for her role in the crowning achievement of 20th century chemistry, the synthesis of bright blue Jell-O.
- Economics: The investors of Lloyd's of London, heirs to 300 years of dull prudent management, for their bold attempt to ensure disaster by refusing to pay for their company's losses.
- Literature: Yuri Struchkov, unstoppable author from the Institute of Organoelement Compounds in Moscow, for the 948 scientific papers he published between the years 1981 and 1990, averaging more than one every 3.9 days.
- Medicine: F. Kanda, E. Yagi, M. Fukuda, K. Nakajima, T. Ohta, and O. Nakata of the Shiseido Research Center in Yokohama, for their pioneering research study "Elucidation of Chemical Compounds Responsible for Foot Malodour," especially for their conclusion that people who think they have foot odor do, and those who don't, don't.
- Nutrition: The utilizers of SPAM, "courageous consumers of canned comestibles", for 54 years of undiscriminating digestion.
- Peace: Daryl Gates, former police chief of the City of Los Angeles, for his uniquely compelling methods of "bringing people together".
- Physics: David Chorley and Doug Bower, "lions of low-energy physics", for their circular contributions to field theory based on the geometrical destruction of English crops.

== 1993 ==
- Biology: Presented jointly to Paul Williams Jr. of the Oregon State Health Division and Kenneth W. Newel of the Liverpool School of Tropical Medicine, "bold biological detectives", for their pioneering study, "Salmonella Excretion in Joy-Riding Pigs".
- Chemistry: Presented jointly to James and Gaines Campbell of Lookout Mountain, Tennessee, "dedicated deliverers of fragrance", for inventing scent strips, the odious method by which perfume is applied to magazine pages.
- Consumer Engineering: Presented to Ron Popeil, incessant inventor and perpetual pitchman of late night television, for redefining the industrial revolution with such devices as the Veg-O-Matic, the Pocket Fisherman, Mr. Microphone, and the Inside-the-Shell Egg Scrambler.
- Economics: Presented to Ravi Batra of Southern Methodist University, shrewd economist and best-selling author of The Great Depression of 1990 (ISBN 978-0-440-20168-7) and Surviving the Great Depression of 1990, (ISBN 978-0-671-66324-7) for selling enough copies of his books to single-handedly prevent worldwide economic collapse.
- Literature: Presented to T. Morrison, E. Topol, R. Califf, F. Van de Werf, P. W. Armstrong, and their 972 co-authors, for publishing a medical research paper which has one hundred times as many authors as pages. The authors are from the following countries: Australia, Belgium, Canada, France, Germany, Ireland, Israel, Luxembourg, the Netherlands, New Zealand, Poland, Spain, Switzerland, the United Kingdom, and the United States.
- Mathematics: Presented to Robert W. Faid of Greenville, South Carolina, "farsighted and faithful seer of statistics", for calculating the exact odds (710,609,175,188,282,000 to 1) that Mikhail Gorbachev is the Antichrist.
- Medicine: Presented to James F. Nolan, Thomas J. Stillwell, and John P. Sands, Jr., "medical men of mercy", for their painstaking research report, "Acute Management of the Zipper-Entrapped Penis".
- Peace: The Pepsi-Cola Company of the Philippines, for sponsoring a contest to create a millionaire, and then announcing the wrong winning number, thereby inciting and uniting 800,000 riotously expectant winners, and bringing many warring factions together for the first time in their nation's history.
- Physics: Presented to Corentin Louis Kervran of France, "ardent admirer of alchemy", for his conclusion that the calcium in chickens' eggshells is created by a process of cold fusion.
- Psychology: Presented jointly to John E. Mack of Harvard Medical School and David M. Jacobs of Temple University, for their conclusion that people who believe they were kidnapped by aliens from outer space probably were—and especially for their conclusion, "the focus of the abduction is the production of children".
- Visionary Technology: Presented jointly to Jay Schiffman of Farmington Hills, Michigan, crack inventor of AutoVision, an image projection device that makes it possible to drive a car and watch television at the same time, and to the Michigan State Legislature, for making it legal to do so.

== 1994 ==
- Biology: Presented to W. Brian Sweeney, Brian Krafte-Jacobs, Jeffrey W. Britton, and Wayne Hansen, for their breakthrough study, "The Constipated Serviceman: Prevalence Among Deployed US Troops," and especially for their numerical analysis of bowel movement frequency.
- Chemistry: Presented to Texas State Senator Bob Glasgow, writer of logical legislation, for sponsoring the 1989 drug control law which makes it illegal to purchase beakers, flasks, test tubes, or other laboratory glassware without a permit.
- Economics: Presented to Juan Pablo Dávila of Chile, "tireless trader of financial futures" and former employee of the state-owned company Codelco, for accidentally instructing his computer to "buy" when he meant "sell". He subsequently attempted to recoup his losses by making increasingly unprofitable trades that ultimately lost 0.5 percent of Chile's gross national product. Davila's relentless achievement inspired his countrymen to coin a new verb, "davilar", meaning "to botch things up royally".
- Entomology: Presented to Robert A. Lopez of Westport, NY, "valiant veterinarian and friend of all creatures great and small", for his series of experiments in obtaining ear mites from cats, inserting them into his own ear, and carefully observing and analyzing the results.
- Literature: Presented to L. Ron Hubbard, ardent author of science fiction and founding father of Scientology, for his crackling Good Book, Dianetics, which is highly profitable to humankind, or to a portion thereof.
- Mathematics: Presented to The Southern Baptist Church of Alabama, mathematical measurers of morality, for their county-by-county estimate of how many Alabama citizens will go to Hell if they don't repent.
- Medicine: Two prizes. First, to Patient X, formerly of the US Marine Corps, valiant victim of a venomous bite from his pet rattlesnake, for his determined use of electroshock therapy. At his own insistence, automobile spark plug wires were attached to his lip, and the car engine revved to 3,000 rpm for five minutes. Second, to Dr. Richard C. Dart of the Rocky Mountain Poison Center and Dr. Richard A. Gustafson of the University of Arizona Health Sciences Center, who referenced Patient X in their well-grounded medical report, "Failure of Electric Shock Treatment for Rattlesnake Envenomation."
- Peace: Presented to John Hagelin of Maharishi University and The Institute of Science, Technology and Public Policy, for his experimental conclusion that 4,000 trained meditators caused a 24 percent decrease in violent crime in Washington, D.C.
- Psychology: Presented to Lee Kuan Yew, former Prime Minister of Singapore, for his thirty-year study of the effects of punishing three million citizens of Singapore whenever they spat, chewed gum, or fed pigeons.

=== No longer officially listed ===
- Physics: Presented to the Japanese Meteorological Agency, for its seven-year study of whether earthquakes are caused by catfish wiggling their tails. This winner is not officially listed, as it was based on what turned out to be erroneous press accounts.

== 1995 ==
The ceremony took place on 6 October 1995.

- Chemistry: Presented to Bijan Pakzad of Beverly Hills, for creating DNA Cologne and DNA Perfume, neither of which contain deoxyribonucleic acid, and both of which come in a triple helix bottle.
- Dentistry: Presented to Robert H. Beaumont, of Shoreview, Minnesota, for his incisive study "Patient Preference for Waxed or Unwaxed Dental Floss".
- Economics: Presented jointly to Nick Leeson and his superiors at Barings Bank and to Robert Citron of Orange County, California for using the calculus of derivatives to demonstrate that every financial institution has its limits.
- Literature: Presented to David B. Busch and James R. Starling, of Madison, Wisconsin, for their research report, "Rectal Foreign Bodies: Case Reports and a Comprehensive Review of the World's Literature." The citations include reports of, among other items: seven light bulbs; a knife sharpener; two flashlights; a wire spring; a snuff box; an oil can with potato stopper; eleven different forms of fruits, vegetables and other foodstuffs; a jeweler's saw; a frozen pig's tail; a tin cup; a beer glass; and one patient's remarkable ensemble collection consisting of spectacles, a suitcase key, a tobacco pouch and a magazine.
- Medicine: Presented to Marcia E. Buebel, David S. Shannahoff-Khalsa, and Michael R. Boyle, for their study entitled "The Effects of Unilateral Forced Nostril Breathing on Cognition."
- Nutrition: Presented to John Martinez of J. Martinez & Company in Atlanta, for luak coffee, the world's most expensive coffee, which is made from coffee beans ingested and excreted by the luak, a raccoon-like animal native to Indonesia.
- Peace: Presented to the Legislative Yuan of Taiwan, for demonstrating that "politicians gain more by punching, kicking and gouging each other than by waging war against other nations".
- Physics: Presented to Dominique M.R. Georget, R. Parker, and Andrew C. Smith of Norwich, England, for their rigorous analysis of soggy breakfast cereal. It was published in the report entitled "A Study of the Effects of Water Content on the Compaction Behaviour of Breakfast Cereal Flakes."
- Psychology: Presented to Shigeru Watanabe, Junko Sakamoto, and Masumi Wakita, of Keio University, for their success in training pigeons to discriminate between the paintings of Picasso and those of Monet.
- Public Health: Presented to Martha Kold Bakkevig of Sintef Unimed in Trondheim, Norway, and Ruth Nielsen of the Technical University of Denmark, for their exhaustive study, "Impact of Wet Underwear on Thermoregulatory Responses and Thermal Comfort in the Cold."

== 1996 ==
Video of the 1996 Ceremony, incl. several Nobel Prize winners

The ceremony took place on 3 October 1996.

- Art: Presented to Don Featherstone of Fitchburg, Massachusetts, for his ornamentally evolutionary invention, the plastic pink flamingo. Featherstone was the first Ig Nobel Prize winner to appear in person at the awards ceremony to accept the award.
- Biodiversity: Presented to Chonosuke Okamura of the Okamura Fossil Laboratory in Nagoya, Japan, for discovering the fossils of dinosaurs, horses, dragons, and more than one thousand other extinct "mini-species", each of which is less than 0.25 mm in length.
- Biology: Presented jointly to Anders Bærheim and Hogne Sandvik of the University of Bergen, Norway, for their report, "Effect of Ale, Garlic, and Soured Cream on the Appetite of Leeches."
- Chemistry: Presented to George Goble of Purdue University, for his blistering world record time for igniting a barbecue grill: three seconds, using charcoal and liquid oxygen.
- Economics: Presented to Dr. Robert J. Genco of the University at Buffalo for his discovery that "financial strain is a risk indicator for destructive periodontal disease".
- Literature: Presented to the editors of the journal Social Text for publishing a paper composed under deceptive pretenses that couched an absurd but theoretically specialized argument about the nature of gravity in a mire of academic buzzwords associated with humanities departments. (See Sokal Affair for details).
- Medicine: Presented to James Johnston of R.J. Reynolds, Joseph Taddeo of U.S. Tobacco, Andrew Tisch of Lorillard, William Campbell of Philip Morris, Edward A. Horrigan of Liggett Group, Donald S. Johnston of American Tobacco Company, and Thomas E. Sandefur, Jr., chairman of Brown and Williamson Tobacco Company, for their unshakable discovery, as testified to the U.S. Congress, that nicotine is not addictive.
- Peace: Presented to Jacques Chirac, President of France, for commemorating the fiftieth anniversary of Hiroshima with atomic bomb tests in the Pacific.
- Physics: Presented to Robert Matthews of Aston University, England, for his demonstration that the buttered toast phenomenon is ultimately based in the fundamental physical constants.
- Public Health: Presented to Ellen Kleist of Nuuk, Greenland and Harald Moi of Oslo, Norway, for their cautionary medical report "Transmission of Gonorrhea Through an Inflatable Doll."

== 1997 ==
The ceremony took place on 9 October 1997.

- Astronomy: Presented to Richard C. Hoagland of New Jersey, for identifying artificial features on the Moon and on Mars, including a human face on Mars and ten-mile high buildings on the far side of the Moon.
- Biology: Presented to T. Yagyu and his colleagues from the University Hospital of Zürich, Switzerland, the Kansai Medical University in Osaka, Japan, and the Neuroscience Technology Research in Prague, Czech Republic, for measuring people's brainwave patterns while they chewed different flavors of gum.
- Communications: Presented to Sanford Wallace, president of Cyber Promotions of Philadelphia. Nothing has stopped this self-appointed courier from delivering electronic junk mail to all the world.
- Economics: Presented to Akihiro Yokoi of Wiz Company in Chiba, Japan, and Aki Maita of Bandai Company in Tokyo, for diverting millions of man-hours of work into the husbandry of virtual pets.
- Entomology: Presented to Mark Hostetler of the University of Florida, for his book, That Gunk on Your Car, (ISBN 978-0-89815-961-5) which identifies the insect splats that appear on automobile windows.
- Literature: Presented to Doron Witztum, Eliyahu Rips, and Yoav Rosenberg of Israel, and to Michael Drosnin of the United States, for their claimed statistical discovery of a hidden code in the Bible.
- Medicine: Presented to Carl J. Charnetski and Francis X. Brennan, Jr. of Wilkes University, and James F. Harrison of Muzak Ltd. in Seattle, Washington, for their discovery that listening to Muzak stimulates the immune system and thus may help prevent the common cold.
- Meteorology: Presented to Bernard Vonnegut of the State University of New York at Albany, for his report, "Chicken Plucking as Measure of Tornado Wind Speed."
- Peace: Presented to Harold Hillman of the University of Surrey, England, for his report "The Possible Pain Experienced During Execution by Different Methods."
- Physics: Presented to John Bockris of Texas A&M University, for his achievements in cold fusion, in the transmutation of base elements into gold, and in the electrochemical incineration of domestic rubbish.

== 1998 ==
The ceremony took place on 8 October 1998.

- Chemistry: Presented to Jacques Benveniste of France, for his homeopathic "discovery" that not only does water have memory, but that the information can be transmitted over telephone lines and the Internet.
- Biology: Presented to Peter Fong of Gettysburg College, Gettysburg, Pennsylvania, for contributing to the happiness of clams by giving them Prozac.
- Economics: Presented to Richard Seed of Chicago for his efforts to stoke up the world economy by cloning himself and other human beings.
- Literature: Presented to Dr. Mara Sidoli of Washington, D.C., for her illuminating report, "Farting as a Defence Against Unspeakable Dread".
- Medicine: Presented to Patient Y and to his doctors, Caroline Mills, Meirion Llewelyn, David Kelly, and Peter Holt, of Royal Gwent Hospital, in Newport for the cautionary medical report, "A Man Who Pricked His Finger and Smelled Putrid for 5 Years."
- Peace: Presented to Prime Minister of India, Atal Bihari Vajpayee and Prime Minister of Pakistan, Nawaz Sharif, for their aggressively peaceful detonations of atomic bombs.
- Physics: Presented to Deepak Chopra of The Chopra Center for Well Being, La Jolla, California, for his unique interpretation of quantum physics as it applies to life, liberty, and the pursuit of economic happiness.
- Safety Engineering: Presented to Troy Hurtubise, of North Bay, Ontario, for developing and personally testing a suit of armor that is impervious to grizzly bears.
- Science Education: Presented to Dolores Krieger, professor emerita, New York University, for demonstrating the merits of therapeutic touch, a method by which nurses manipulate the energy fields of ailing patients by carefully avoiding physical contact with those patients.
- Statistics: Presented to Jerald Bain of Mt. Sinai Hospital in Toronto and Kerry Siminoski of the University of Alberta, for their carefully measured report, "The Relationship Among Height, Penile Length, and Foot Size".

== 1999 ==
The ceremony took place on 30 September 1999.

- Biology: Presented to Dr. Paul Bosland, director of The Chile Pepper Institute, New Mexico State University, Las Cruces, New Mexico, for breeding a spiceless jalapeño chili pepper.
- Chemistry: Presented to Takeshi Makino, president of The Safety Detective Agency in Osaka, Japan, for his involvement with S-Check, an infidelity detection spray that wives can apply to their husbands' underwear.
- Environmental Protection: Presented to Hyuk-ho Kwon of Kolon Company of Seoul, South Korea, for inventing the self-perfuming business suit.
- Literature: Presented to the British Standards Institution for its six-page specification (BS 6008) of the proper way to make a cup of tea.
- Managed Health Care: Presented to George and Charlotte Blonsky of New York City and San Jose, California, for inventing an Apparatus for facilitating the birth of a child by centrifugal force (U.S. patent 3,216,423) to aid women in giving birth: the woman is strapped onto a circular table, and the table is then rotated at high speed.
- Medicine: Presented to Arvid Vatle of Stord, Norway, for carefully collecting, classifying, and contemplating which kinds of containers his patients chose when submitting urine samples.
- Peace: Presented to Charl Fourie and Michelle Wong of Johannesburg, South Africa, for inventing the Blaster, a foot-pedal activated flamethrower that motorists can use against carjackers.
- Physics: Presented to Dr. Len Fisher of Bristol, England and Sydney, Australia for calculating the optimal way to dunk a biscuit (cookie). Also, to Professor Jean-Marc Vanden-Broeck of the University of East Anglia, England, and Belgium, and Joseph Keller of the U.S. for calculating how to make a teapot spout that does not drip.
- Science Education: Presented to the Kansas State Board of Education and the Colorado State Board of Education, for mandating that children should not believe in Darwin's theory of evolution any more than they believe in Newton's theory of gravitation, Faraday's and Maxwell's theory of electromagnetism, or Pasteur's theory that germs cause disease.
- Sociology: Presented to Steve Penfold, of York University in Toronto, for doing his PhD thesis on the history of Canadian doughnut shops.

== 2000 ==
The ceremony took place on 5 October 2000.

- Biology: Presented to Richard Wassersug of Dalhousie University, for his firsthand report, "On the Comparative Palatability of Some Dry-Season Tadpoles from Costa Rica".
- Chemistry: Presented to Donatella Marazziti, Alessandra Rossi, and Giovanni B. Cassano of the University of Pisa, Italy, and Hagop S. Akiskal of the University of California, San Diego, for their discovery that, biochemically, romantic love may be indistinguishable from having severe obsessive-compulsive disorder.
- Computer Science: Presented to Chris Niswander of Tucson, Arizona, for inventing PawSense, software that detects when a cat is walking across your computer keyboard.
- Economics: Presented to The Reverend Sun Myung Moon, for bringing efficiency and steady growth to the mass marriage industry, with, according to his reports, a 36-couple wedding in 1960, a 430-couple wedding in 1968, an 1,800-couple wedding in 1975, a 6,000-couple wedding in 1982, a 30,000-couple wedding in 1992, a 360,000-couple wedding in 1995, and a 36,000,000-couple wedding in 1997.
- Literature: Presented to Jasmuheen (formerly known as Ellen Greve) of Australia, first lady of Breatharianism, for her book Living on Light, which explains that although some people do eat food, they don't ever really need to.
- Medicine: Presented to Willibrord Weijmar Schultz, Pek van Andel, and Eduard Mooyaart of Groningen, the Netherlands, and Ida Sabelis of Amsterdam, for their illuminating report "Magnetic Resonance Imaging of Male and Female Genitals During Coitus and Female Sexual Arousal."
- Peace: Presented to the Royal Navy, for ordering its sailors to stop using live cannon shells, and to instead just shout "Bang!"
- Physics: Presented to Andre Geim of the University of Nijmegen, the Netherlands, and Michael Berry of Bristol University, England, for using magnets to levitate a frog. Geim later shared the 2010 Nobel Prize in physics for his research on graphene, the first time anyone has been awarded both the Ig Nobel and (real) Nobel Prizes. By 2022, their magnetic levitation of a frog was reportedly part of the inspiration for China's lunar gravity research facility.
- Psychology: Presented to David Dunning of Cornell University and Justin Kruger of the University of Illinois, for their modest report, "Unskilled and Unaware of It: How Difficulties in Recognizing One's Own Incompetence Lead to Inflated Self-Assessments".
- Public Health: Presented to Jonathan Wyatt, Gordon McNaughton, and William Tullett of Glasgow, for their alarming report, "The Collapse of Toilets in Glasgow".

== 2001 ==
The ceremony took place on 4 October 2001.

Category	Winner(s)	Rationale	Refs
Astrophysics	Jack and Rexella Van Impe	"for their discovery that black holes fulfill all the technical requirements to be the location of Hell"	
Biology	Buck Weimer	"for inventing Under-Ease, airtight underwear with a replaceable charcoal filter that removes bad-smelling gases before they escape"	
Economics	Joel Slemrod and Wojciech Kopczuk	"for their conclusion that people find a way to postpone their deaths if that would qualify them for a lower rate on the inheritance tax"	
Literature	John Richards	"for his efforts to protect, promote, and defend the differences between plural and possessive"	
Medicine	Peter Barss	"for his impactful medical report Injuries Due to Falling Coconuts"	
Peace	Viliumas Malinauskus	"for creating the amusement park known as Stalin World"	
Physics	David Schmidt	"for his partial solution to the question of why shower curtains billow inwards"	
Psychology	Lawrence W. Sherman	"for his influential research report An Ecological Study of Glee in Small Groups of Preschool Children"	
Public Health	Chittaranjan Andrade and B. S. Srihari	"for their probing medical discovery that nose picking is a common activity among adolescents"	
Technology	John Keogh	"for patenting the wheel in the year 2001"	
Technology	Australian Patent Office	"for granting him Innovation Patent #2001100012"	

== 2002 ==
The ceremony took place on 3 October 2002.

Category	Winner(s)	Rationale	Refs
Biology	Norma Bubier, Charles G.M. Paxton, Phil Bowers, and D. Charles Deeming	"for their report Courtship Behaviour of Ostriches Towards Humans Under Farming Conditions in Britain"	
Chemistry	Theodore Gray	"for gathering many elements of the periodic table, and assembling them into the form of a four-legged periodic table table"	
Economics	The executives, corporate directors, and auditors of Enron, Lernaut & Hauspie, Adelphia, Bank of Commerce and Credit International, Cendant, CMS Energy, Duke Energy, Dynegy, Gazprom, Global Crossing, HIH Insurance, Informix, Kmart, Maxwell Communications, McKessonHBOC, Merrill Lynch, Merck, Peregrine Systems, Qwest Communications, Reliant Resources, Rent-Way, Rite Aid, Sunbeam, Tyco, Waste Management, WorldCom, Xerox, and Arthur Andersen	"for adapting the mathematical concept of imaginary numbers for use in the business world"	(Note: All companies except for Arthur Andersen were forced to restate their financial reports due to false or incorrect accounting. Arthur Andersen was the accounting firm most identified with the scandals, having been indicted on criminal charges stemming from its actions as auditor of Enron. See Enron scandal and Accounting scandals for more details.)
Hygiene	Eduardo Segura	"for inventing a washing machine for cats and dogs"	
Interdisciplinary Research	Karl Kruszelnicki	"for performing a comprehensive survey of human belly button lint – who gets it, when, what color, and how much"	
Literature	Vicki Silvers Gier and David S. Kreiner	"for their colorful report The Effects of Pre-Existing Inappropriate Highlighting on Reading Comprehension"	
Mathematics	K.P. Sreekumar and G. Nirmalan^{†}	"for their analytical report Estimation of the Total Surface Area in Indian Elephants"	
Medicine	Chris McManus	"for his excruciatingly balanced report, Scrotal Asymmetry in Man and in Ancient Sculpture"	
Peace	Keita Sato, Matsumi Suzuki, and Norio Kogure	"for promoting peace and harmony between the species by inventing Bow-Lingual, a computer-based automatic dog-to-human language translation device"	
Physics	Arnd Leike	"for demonstrating that beer froth obeys the mathematical Law of exponential decay"	

== 2003 ==
The ceremony took place on 2 October 2003.

Category	Winner(s)	Rationale	Refs
Biology	C. W. Moeliker	"for documenting the first scientifically recorded case of homosexual necrophilia in the mallard duck"	
Chemistry	Yukio Hirose	"for his chemical investigation of a bronze statue, in the city of Kanazawa, that fails to attract pigeons"	
Economics	Karl Schwärzler and the nation of Liechtenstein	"for making it possible to rent the entire country for corporate conventions, weddings, bar mitzvahs, and other gatherings"	
Engineering	John Paul Stapp^{†}, Edward A. Murphy, Jr.^{†}, and George Nichols	"for jointly giving birth in 1949 to Murphy's Law, the basic engineering principle that "If there are two or more ways to do something, and one of those ways can result in a catastrophe, someone will do it" (or, in other words: "If anything can go wrong, it will")"	
Interdisciplinary Research	Stefano Ghirlanda, Liselotte Jansson, and Magnus Enquist	"for their report Chickens Prefer Beautiful Humans"	
Literature	John Trinkaus	"for meticulously collecting data and publishing more than 80 detailed academic reports about things that annoyed him (such as: What percentage of young people wear baseball caps with the peak facing to the rear rather than to the front; What percentage of pedestrians wear sport shoes that are white rather than some other color; What percentage of swimmers swim laps in the shallow end of a pool rather than the deep end; What percentage of automobile drivers almost, but not completely, come to a stop at one particular stop-sign; What percentage of commuters carry attaché cases; What percentage of shoppers exceed the number of items permitted in a supermarket's express checkout lane; and What percentage of students dislike the taste of Brussels sprouts.)"	(Note: 86 of John Trinkaus' publications are listed in a special issue of Annals of Improbable Research.)
Medicine	Eleanor Maguire, David Gadian, Ingrid Johnsrude, Catriona Good, John Ashburner, Richard Frackowiak, and Christopher Frith	"for presenting evidence that the brains of London taxi drivers are more highly developed than those of their fellow citizens"	
Peace	Lal Bihari	"for a triple accomplishment: First, for leading an active life even though he has been declared legally dead; Second, for waging a lively posthumous campaign against bureaucratic inertia and greedy relatives; and Third, for creating the Association of Dead People"	
Physics	Jack Harvey, John Culvenor, Warren Payne, Steve Cowley, Michael Lawrance, David Stuart, and Robyn Williams	"for their irresistible report An Analysis of the Forces Required to Drag Sheep over Various Surfaces"	
Psychology	Gian Vittorio Caprara, Claudio Barbaranelli, and Philip Zimbardo	"for their discerning report Politicians' Uniquely Simple Personalities"	

== 2004 ==
The ceremony took place on 30 September 2004.

Category	Winner(s)	Rationale	Refs
Biology	Ben Wilson, Lawrence Dill, Robert Batty, Magnus Whalberg, and Hakan Westerberg	"for showing that herrings apparently communicate by farting"	(Note: It has been suggested that the study of this phenomenon has had major political consequences. Following the sensational stranding of a Soviet submarine deep inside Swedish waters on 27 October 1981, the Swedish navy initiated a large-scale campaign to guard Swedish territorial waters from the perceived threat of infiltration by foreign submarines, despite the Soviets consistently asserting that the stranding had occurred due to navigational errors. The "submarine hunts", which lasted throughout the 1980s and early 1990s, have been a heavily debated issue in Sweden, as to whether or not there ever was any factual substance to the claims of Soviet infiltration. One widely reported piece of "evidence" were several sound recordings of what the Swedish navy suspected to be foreign submarines. Oceanographers and marine biologists were invited to study the recordings and would eventually find that the sounds heard were most probably produced not by submarines, but in fact were the noises made when herring passed gas. In a reportage by the Swedish science magazine "Vetenskapens värld" ("World of science") televised on 16 April 2012, it's suggested that these findings were important in putting an end to the costly "submarine hunts" which had continued for more than a decade, with Ig Nobel laureate Håkan Westerberg guessing that this would have saved Swedish tax payers hundreds of millions in SEK.)
Chemistry	The Coca-Cola Company of Great Britain	"for using advanced technology to convert ordinary tap water into Dasani, a transparent form of water, which for precautionary reasons has been made unavailable to consumers"	
Economics	The Vatican	"for outsourcing prayers to India"	
Engineering	Donald J. Smith, Frank J. Smith^{†}	"for patenting the combover"	
Literature	The American Nudist Research Library of Kissimmee, Florida, USA	"for preserving nudist history so that everyone can see it"	
Medicine	Steven Stack and James Gundlach	"for their published report The Effect of Country Music on Suicide"	
Peace	Daisuke Inoue	"for inventing karaoke, thereby providing an entirely new way for people to learn to tolerate each other"	
Physics	Ramesh Balasubramaniam and Michael Turvey	"for exploring and explaining the dynamics of hula-hooping"	
Psychology	Daniel Simons and Christopher Chabris	"for demonstrating that when people pay close attention to something, it's all too easy to overlook anything else – even a woman in a gorilla suit"	
Public Health	Jillian Clarke	"for investigating the scientific validity of the Five-Second Rule about whether it's safe to eat food that's been dropped on the floor"	

== 2005 ==
The ceremony took place on 6 October 2005.

Category	Winner(s)	Rationale	Refs
Agricultural History	James Watson	"for his scholarly study, The Significance of Mr. Richard Buckley's Exploding trousers"	
Biology	Benjamin Smith, Craig Williams, Michael Tyler, Brian Williams, Yoji Hayasaka	"for painstakingly smelling and cataloging the peculiar odors produced by 131 different species of frogs when the frogs were feeling stressed."	
Chemistry	Edward Cussler and Brian Gettelfinger	"for conducting a careful experiment to settle the longstanding scientific question: can people swim faster in syrup or in water?"	
Economics	Gauri Nanda	"for inventing an alarm clock that runs away and hides, repeatedly, thus ensuring that people DO get out of bed, and thus theoretically adding many productive hours to the workday"	
Fluid Dynamics	Victor Benno Meyer-Rochow and Jozsef Gal	"for using basic principles of physics to calculate the pressure that builds up inside a penguin, as detailed in their report Pressures Produced When Penguins Pooh – Calculations on Avian Defaecation"	
Literature	The Internet entrepreneurs of Nigeria	"for creating and then using e-mail to distribute a bold series of short stories, thus introducing millions of readers to a cast of rich characters – General Sani Abacha, Mrs. Mariam Sanni Abacha, Barrister Jon A Mbeki Esq., and others – each of whom requires just a small amount of expense money so as to obtain access to the great wealth to which they are entitled and which they would like to share with the kind person who assists them"	
Medicine	Gregg A. Miller	"for inventing Neuticles – artificial replacement testicles for dogs, which are available in three sizes, and three degrees of firmness"	
Nutrition	Yoshiro Nakamatsu	"for photographing and retrospectively analyzing every meal he has consumed during a period of 34 years (and counting)"	
Peace	Claire Rind and Peter Simmons	"for electrically monitoring the activity of a brain cell in a locust while that locust was watching selected highlights from the movie Star Wars"	
Physics	John Mainstone and Thomas Parnell^{†}	"for patiently conducting an experiment that began in the year 1927 – in which a glob of congealed black tar has been slowly, slowly dripping through a funnel, at a rate of approximately one drop every nine years"	

== 2006 ==
The ceremony took place on 5 October 2006.

Category	Winner(s)	Rationale	Refs
Acoustics	D. Lynn Halpern, Randolph Blake, and James Hillenbrand	"for conducting experiments to learn why people dislike the sound of fingernails scraping on a blackboard"	
Biology	Bart Knols and Ruurd de Jong	"for showing that the female malaria mosquito Anopheles gambiae is attracted equally to the smell of limburger cheese and to the smell of human feet"	
Chemistry	Antonio Mulet, José Javier Benedito and José Bon	"for their study Ultrasonic Velocity in Cheddar Cheese as Affected by Temperature"	
Literature	Daniel Oppenheimer	"for his report Consequences of Erudite Vernacular Utilized Irrespective of Necessity: Problems with Using Long Words Needlessly"	
Mathematics	Nic Svenson and Piers Barnes	"for calculating the number of photographs you must take to (almost) ensure that nobody in a group photo will have their eyes closed"	
Medicine	Francis M. Fesmire	"for his medical case report Termination of Intractable Hiccups with Digital Rectal Massage"	
Medicine	Majed Odeh, Harry Bassan, and Arie Oliven	"for their subsequent medical case report also titled Termination of Intractable Hiccups with Digital Rectal Massage"	
Nutrition	Wasmia Al-Houty and Faten Al-Mussalam	"for showing that dung beetles are finicky eaters"	
Ornithology	Ivan R. Schwab and Philip R.A. May	"for exploring and explaining why woodpeckers don't get headaches"	
Peace	Howard Stapleton	"for inventing an electromechanical teenager repellant – a device that makes annoying high-pitched noise designed to be audible to teenagers but not to adults; and for later using that same technology to make telephone ringtones that are audible to teenagers but probably not to their teachers"	
Physics	Basile Audoly and Sebastien Neukirch	"for their insights into why, when you bend dry spaghetti, it often breaks into more than two pieces"	

== 2007 ==
The ceremony took place on 4 October 2007.

Category	Winner(s)	Rationale	Refs
Aviation	Patricia V. Agostino, Santiago A. Plano and Diego A. Golombek	"for their discovery that Viagra aids jetlag recovery in hamsters"	
Biology	Johanna E.M.H. van Bronswijk	"for doing a census of all the mites, insects, spiders, pseudoscorpions, crustaceans, bacteria, algae, ferns and fungi with whom we share our beds each night"	
Chemistry	Mayu Yamamoto	"for developing a way to extract vanillin – vanilla fragrance and flavoring – from cow dung"	(Note: Toscanini's, a well-known ice cream parlour based in Cambridge, Massachusetts, introduced a new ice cream flavour at the Ig Nobel Ceremony in honour of Mayu Yamamoto's work, called "Yum-a-Moto Vanilla Twist".)
Economics	Kuo Cheng Hsieh	"for patenting a device, in the year 2001, that catches bank robbers by dropping a net over them"	(Note: Zoltan Egeresi, a Californian inventor, filed a similar patent for a net-trapping device in 2003, taking inspiration from Kuo Cheng Hsieh's 2001 anti-bank-robbing device (winner of the 2007 Ig Nobel Economics Prize) and simplifying Gustano Pizzo's anti-hijacking device from early 1970s (winner of the 2013 Ig Nobel Safety Engineering Prize).)
Linguistics	Juan Manuel Toro, Josep B. Trobalon and Núria Sebastián-Gallés	"for showing that rats sometimes cannot tell the difference between a person speaking Japanese backwards and a person speaking Dutch backwards"	
Literature	Glenda Browne	"for her study of the word the – and of the many ways it causes problems for anyone who tries to put things into alphabetical order"	
Medicine	Brian Witcombe and Dan Meyer	"for their penetrating medical report Sword Swallowing and Its Side Effects"	
Nutrition	Brian Wansink	"for exploring the seemingly boundless appetites of human beings, by feeding them with a self-refilling, bottomless bowl of soup"	
Peace	Wright Laboratory in Dayton, Ohio	"for instigating research & development on a chemical weapon – the so-called gay bomb – that will make enemy soldiers become sexually irresistible to each other"	
Physics	L. Mahadevan, and Enrique Cerda Villablanca	"for studying how sheets become wrinkled"	

== 2008 ==
The ceremony took place on 2 October 2008.

Category	Winner(s)	Rationale	Refs
Archaeology	Astolfo G. Mello Araujo and José Carlos Marcelino	"for measuring how the course of history, or at least the contents of an archaeological dig site, can be scrambled by the actions of a live armadillo"	
Biology	Marie-Christine Cadiergues, Christel Joubert, and Michel Franc	"for discovering that the fleas that live on a dog can jump higher than the fleas that live on a cat"	
Chemistry	Sharee A. Umpierre, Joseph A. Hill, and Deborah J. Anderson	"for discovering that Coca-Cola is an effective spermicide"	
Chemistry	Chuang-Ye Hong, C.C. Shieh, P. Wu, and B.N. Chiang	"for discovering that it is not"	
Cognitive Science	Toshiyuki Nakagaki, Hiroyasu Yamada, Ryo Kobayashi, Atsushi Tero, Akio Ishiguro, and Ágotá Tóth	"for discovering that slime molds can solve puzzles"	
Economics	Geoffrey Miller, Joshua Tybur, and Brent Jordan	"for discovering that professional lap dancers earn higher tips when they are ovulating"	
Literature	David Sims	"for his lovingly written study You Bastard: A Narrative Exploration of the Experience of Indignation within Organizations"	
Medicine	Dan Ariely, Rebecca L. Waber, Baba Shiv, and Ziv Carmon	"for demonstrating that high-priced fake medicine is more effective than low-priced fake medicine"	
Nutrition	Massimiliano Zampini and Charles Spence	"for electronically modifying the sound of a potato chip to make the person chewing the chip believe it to be crisper and fresher than it really is"	
Peace	The Swiss Federal Ethics Committee on Non-Human Biotechnology and the citizens of Switzerland	"for adopting the legal principle that plants have dignity"	
Physics	Dorian Raymer and Douglas Smith	"for proving mathematically that heaps of string or hair or almost anything else will inevitably tangle themselves up in knots"	

== 2009 ==
The ceremony took place on 1 October 2009.

Category	Winner(s)	Rationale	Refs
Biology	Fumiaki Taguchi, Song Guofu, and Zhang Guanglei	"for demonstrating that kitchen refuse can be reduced more than 90% in mass by using bacteria extracted from the feces of giant pandas"	
Chemistry	Javier Morales, Miguel Apátiga, and Victor M. Castaño	"for creating diamonds from liquid – specifically from tequila"	
Economics	The directors, executives, and auditors of four Icelandic banks – Kaupthing Bank, Landsbanki, Glitnir Bank, and Central Bank of Iceland	"for demonstrating that tiny banks can be rapidly transformed into huge banks, and vice versa – and for demonstrating that similar things can be done to an entire national economy"	
Literature	Ireland's police service (An Garda Siochana)	"for writing and presenting more than fifty traffic tickets to the most frequent driving offender in the country – Prawo Jazdy – whose name in Polish means Driving License"	(Note: The ceremony was attended by Karolina Lewestam, a Polish citizen and holder of a Polish driver's license, who "expressed her good wishes to the Irish police service" on behalf of all Polish licensed drivers.)
Mathematics	Gideon Gono, governor of Zimbabwe's Reserve Bank	"for giving people a simple, everyday way to cope with a wide range of numbers – from very small to very big – by having his bank print bank notes with denominations ranging from one cent ($.01) to one hundred trillion dollars ($100,000,000,000,000)"	
Medicine	Donald L. Unger	"for investigating a possible cause of arthritis of the fingers, by diligently cracking the knuckles of his left hand – but never cracking the knuckles of his right hand – every day for more than sixty (60) years"	
Peace	Stephan Bolliger, Steffen Ross, Lars Oesterhelweg, Michael Thali and Beat Kneubuehl	"for determining – by experiment – whether it is better to be smashed over the head with a full bottle of beer or with an empty bottle"	
Physics	Katherine K. Whitcome, Daniel E. Lieberman, and Liza J. Shapiro	"for analytically determining why pregnant women don't tip over"	
Public Health	Elena N. Bodnar, Raphael C. Lee, and Sandra Marijan	"for inventing a brassiere that, in an emergency, can be quickly converted into a pair of protective face masks, one for the brassiere wearer and one to be given to some needy bystander"	
Veterinary medicine	Catherine Douglas and Peter Rowlinson	"for showing that cows who have names give more milk than cows that are nameless"	

== 2010 ==
The ceremony took place on 30 September 2010.

Category	Winner(s)	Rationale	Refs
Biology	Libiao Zhang, Min Tan, Guangjian Zhu, Jianping Ye, Tiyu Hong, Shanyi Zhou, Shuyi Zhang, and Gareth Jones	"for scientifically documenting fellatio in fruit bats"	
Chemistry	Eric Adams, Scott Socolofsky, Stephen Masutani, and BP	"for disproving the old belief that oil and water don't mix"	
Economics	The executives and directors of Goldman Sachs, AIG, Lehman Brothers, Bear Stearns, Merrill Lynch and Magnetar	"for creating and promoting new ways to invest money – ways that maximize financial gain and minimize financial risk for the world economy, or for a portion thereof"	
Engineering	Karina Acevedo-Whitehouse, Agnes Rocha-Gosselin, and Diane Gendron	"for perfecting a method to collect whale snot, using a remote-control helicopter"	
Management	Alessandro Pluchino, Andrea Rapisarda, and Cesare Garofalo	"for demonstrating mathematically that organizations would become more efficient if they promoted people at random"	
Medicine	Simon Rietveld and Ilja van Beest	"for discovering that symptoms of asthma can be treated with a roller-coaster ride"	
Peace	Richard Stephens, John Atkins, and Andrew Kingston	"for confirming the widely held belief that swearing relieves pain"	
Physics	Lianne Parkin, Sheila Williams, and Patricia Priest	"for demonstrating that, on icy footpaths in wintertime, people slip and fall less often if they wear socks on the outside of their shoes"	
Public Health	Manuel Barbeito, Charles Mathews, and Larry Taylor	"for determining by experiment that microbes cling to bearded scientists"	
Transportation Planning	Toshiyuki Nakagaki, Atsushi Tero, Seiji Takagi, Tetsu Saigusa, Kentaro Ito, Kenji Yumiki, Ryo Kobayashi, Dan Bebber, and Mark Fricker of the UK	"for using slime mold to determine the optimal routes for railroad tracks"	

== 2011 ==
The ceremony took place on 29 September 2011.

Category	Winner(s)	Rationale	Refs
Biology	Darryl Gwynne and David Rentz	"for discovering that a certain kind of beetle mates with a certain kind of Australian beer bottle"	
Chemistry	Makoto Imai, Naoki Urushihata, Hideki Tanemura, Yukinobu Tajima, Hideaki Goto, Koichiro Mizoguchi and Junichi Murakami	"for determining the ideal density of airborne wasabi (pungent horseradish) to awaken sleeping people in case of a fire or other emergency, and for applying this knowledge to invent the wasabi alarm"	
Literature	John Perry	"for his Theory of Structured Procrastination, which says: To be a high achiever, always work on something important, using it as a way to avoid doing something that's even more important"	
Mathematics	Dorothy Martin (who predicted the world would end in 1954)	"for teaching the world to be careful when making mathematical assumptions and calculations"	
Mathematics	Pat Robertson (who predicted the world would end in 1982)	"for teaching the world to be careful when making mathematical assumptions and calculations"	
Mathematics	Elizabeth Clare Prophet (who predicted the world would end in 1990)	"for teaching the world to be careful when making mathematical assumptions and calculations"	
Mathematics	Lee Jang Rim (who predicted the world would end in 1992)	"for teaching the world to be careful when making mathematical assumptions and calculations"	
Mathematics	Credonia Mwerinde (who predicted the world would end in 1999)	"for teaching the world to be careful when making mathematical assumptions and calculations"	
Mathematics	Harold Camping (who predicted the world would end on 6 September 1994, and later predicted that the world will end on 21 October 2011)	"for teaching the world to be careful when making mathematical assumptions and calculations"	(Note: Harold Camping later admitted his predictions were wrong and that he regrets his misdeeds.)
Medicine	Mirjam Tuk, Debra Trampe, and Luk Warlop	"for demonstrating that people make better decisions about some kinds of things – but worse decisions about other kinds of things, when they have a strong urge to urinate"	
Medicine	Matthew Lewis, Peter Snyder and Robert Feldman, Robert Pietrzak, David Darby, and Paul Maruff	"for demonstrating that people make better decisions about some kinds of things – but worse decisions about other kinds of things, when they have a strong urge to urinate"	
Peace	Arturas Zuokas, the mayor of Vilnius, Lithuania	"for demonstrating that the problem of illegally parked luxury cars can be solved by running them over with an armored tank"	(Note: Note, the vehicle used was not a tank, but a BTR-60 Armoured personnel carrier.)
Psychology	Karl Halvor Teigen	"for trying to understand why, in everyday life, people sigh"	
Physics	Philippe Perrin, Cyril Perrot, Dominique Deviterne, Bruno Ragaru, and Herman Kingma	"for determining why discus throwers become dizzy, and why hammer throwers don't"	
Physiology	Anna Wilkinson, Natalie Sebanz, Isabella Mandl, and Ludwig Huber	"for their study No Evidence of Contagious Yawning in the Red-Footed Tortoise"	
Public safety	John Senders	"for conducting a series of safety experiments in which a person drives an automobile on a major highway while a visor repeatedly flaps down over his face, blinding him"	

== 2012 ==
The ceremony took place on 20 September 2012.

Category	Winner(s)	Rationale	Refs
Acoustics	Kazutaka Kurihara and Koji Tsukada	"for creating the SpeechJammer – a machine that disrupts a person's speech, by making them hear their own spoken words at a very slight delay"	
Anatomy	Frans de Waal and Jennifer Pokorny	"for discovering that chimpanzees can identify other chimpanzees individually from seeing photographs of their rear ends"	
Chemistry	Johan Pettersson	"for solving the puzzle of why, in certain houses in the town of Anderslöv, Sweden, people's hair turned green"	
Fluid Dynamics	Rouslan Krechetnikov and Hans Mayer	"for studying the dynamics of liquid-sloshing, to learn what happens when a person walks while carrying a cup of coffee"	
Literature	The US Government General Accountability Office	"for issuing a report about reports about reports that recommends the preparation of a report about the report about reports about reports"	
Medicine	Emmanuel Ben-Soussan and Michel Antonietti	"for advising doctors who perform colonoscopies how to minimize the chance that their patients will explode"	
Neuroscience	Craig Bennett, Abigail Baird, Michael Miller, and George Wolford	"for demonstrating that brain researchers, by using complicated instruments and simple statistics, can see meaningful brain activity anywhere – even in a dead salmon"	
Peace	The SKN Company	"for converting old Russian ammunition into new diamonds"	
Physics	Joseph Keller	"for calculating the balance of forces that shape and move the hair in a human ponytail"	
Physics	Raymond Goldstein, Patrick Warren, and Robin Ball,	"for calculating the balance of forces that shape and move the hair in a human ponytail"	
Psychology	Anita Eerland, Rolf Zwaan, and Tulio Guadalupe	"for their study Leaning to the Left Makes the Eiffel Tower Seem Smaller"	

== 2013 ==
The ceremony took place on 12 September 2013.

Category	Winner(s)	Rationale	Refs
Archaeology	Brian Crandall and Peter Stahl	"for parboiling a dead shrew, and then swallowing the shrew without chewing, and then carefully examining everything excreted during subsequent days – all so they could see which bones would dissolve inside the human digestive system, and which bones would not"	
Biology and Astronomy	Marie Dacke, Emily Baird, Marcus Byrne, Clarke Scholtz, and Eric J. Warrant	"for discovering that when dung beetles get lost, they can navigate their way home by looking at the Milky Way"	
Chemistry	Shinsuke Imai, Nobuaki Tsuge, Muneaki Tomotake, Yoshiaki Nagatome, H. Sawada, Toshiyuki Nagata, and Hidehiko Kumagai	"for discovering that the biochemical process by which onions make people cry is even more complicated than scientists previously realized"	
Medicine	Masateru Uchiyama, Xiangyuan Jin, Qi Zhang, Toshihito Hirai, Atsushi Amano, Hisashi Bashuda and Masanori Niimi	"for assessing the effect of listening to opera, on heart transplant patients who are mice"	
Peace	Alexander Lukashenko, president of Belarus	"for making it illegal to applaud in public"	
Peace	Belarus State Police	"for arresting a one-armed man for applauding"	
Probability	Bert Tolkamp, Marie Haskell, Fritha Langford, David Roberts, and Colin Morgan	"for making two related discoveries: First, that the longer a cow has been lying down, the more likely that cow will soon stand up; and Second, that once a cow stands up, you cannot easily predict how soon that cow will lie down again"	
Physics	Alberto Minetti, Yuri Ivanenko, Germana Cappellini, Nadia Dominici, and Francesco Lacquaniti	"for discovering that some people would be physically capable of running across the surface of a pond – if those people and that pond were on the moon"	
Psychology	Laurent Bègue, Brad Bushman, Oulmann Zerhouni, Baptiste Subra, and Medhi Ourabah	"for confirming, by experiment, that people who think they are drunk also think they are attractive"	
Public Health	Kasian Bhanganada, Tu Chayavatana, Chumporn Pongnumkul, Anunt Tonmukayakul, Piyasakol Sakolsatayadorn, Krit Komaratal, and Henry Wilde	"for the medical techniques described in their report Surgical Management of an Epidemic of Penile Amputations in Siam – techniques which they recommend, except in cases where the amputated penis had been partially eaten by a duck"	
Safety Engineering	Gustano Pizzo^{†}	"for inventing an electro-mechanical system to trap airplane hijackers – the system drops a hijacker through trap doors, seals him into a package, then drops the encapsulated hijacker through the airplane's specially-installed bomb bay doors, whence he parachutes to earth, where police, having been alerted by radio, await his arrival"	

== 2014 ==
The ceremony took place on 18 September 2014.

Category	Winner(s)	Rationale	Refs
Arctic Science	Eigil Reimers and Sindre Eftestøl	"for testing how reindeer react to seeing humans who are disguised as polar bears"	
Art	Marina de Tommaso, Michele Sardaro, and Paolo Livrea	"for measuring the relative pain people suffer while looking at an ugly painting, rather than a pretty painting, while being shot [in the hand] by a powerful laser beam"	
Biology	Vlastimil Hart, Petra Nováková, Erich Pascal Malkemper, Sabine Begall, Vladimír Hanzal, Miloš Ježek, Tomáš Kušta, Veronika Němcová, Jana Adámková, Kateřina Benediktová, Jaroslav Červený and Hynek Burda	"for carefully documenting that when dogs defecate and urinate, they prefer to align their body axis with Earth's north-south geomagnetic field lines"	
Economics	Italian National Institute of Statistics	"for proudly taking the lead in fulfilling the European Union mandate for each country to increase the official size of its national economy by including revenues from prostitution, illegal drug sales, smuggling, and all other unlawful financial transactions between willing participants"	
Medicine	Ian Humphreys, Sonal Saraiya, Walter Belenky and James Dworkin	"for treating "uncontrollable" nosebleeds, using the method of nasal-packing-with-strips-of-cured-pork."	
Neuroscience	Jiangang Liu, Jun Li, Lu Feng, Ling Li, Jie Tian, and Kang Lee	"for trying to understand what happens in the brains of people who see the face of Jesus in a piece of toast"	
Nutrition	Raquel Rubio, Anna Jofré, Belén Martín, Teresa Aymerich, and Margarita Garriga	"for their study titled Characterization of Lactic Acid Bacteria Isolated from Infant Faeces as Potential Probiotic Starter Cultures for Fermented Sausages"	
Physics	Kiyoshi Mabuchi, Kensei Tanaka, Daichi Uchijima and Rina Sakai	"for measuring the amount of friction between a shoe and a banana skin, and between a banana skin and the floor, when a person steps on a banana skin that's on the floor"	
Psychology	Peter K. Jonason, Amy Jones, and Minna Lyons	"for amassing evidence that people who habitually stay up late are, on average, more self-admiring, more manipulative, and more psychopathic than people who habitually arise early in the morning"	
Public Health	Jaroslav Flegr, Jan Havlíček and Jitka Hanušova-Lindova	"for investigating whether it is mentally hazardous for a human being to own a cat"	
Public Health	David Hanauer, Naren Ramakrishnan, Lisa Seyfried	"for investigating whether it is mentally hazardous for a human being to own a cat"	

== 2015 ==
The 25th First Annual Ig Nobel Prize Ceremony took place on 17 September 2015 and was held at the Harvard's Sanders Theatre.

Category	Winner(s)	Rationale	Refs
Biology	Bruno Grossi, Omar Larach, Mauricio Canals, Rodrigo A. Vásquez, José Iriarte-Díaz	"for observing that when you attach a weighted stick to the rear end of a chicken, the chicken then walks in a manner similar to that in which dinosaurs are thought to have walked"	
Chemistry	Callum Ormonde, Colin Raston, Tom Yuan, Stephan Kudlacek, Sameeran Kunche, Joshua N. Smith, William A. Brown, Kaitlin Pugliese, Tivoli Olsen, Mariam Iftikhar, and Gregory Weiss	"for inventing a chemical recipe to partially un-boil an egg"	
Diagnostic Medicine	Diallah Karim, Anthony Harnden, Nigel D'Souza, Andrew Huang, Abdel Kader Allouni, Helen Ashdown, Richard J. Stevens, and Simon Kreckler	"for determining that acute appendicitis can be accurately diagnosed by the amount of pain evident when the patient is driven over speed bumps"	
Economics	The Bangkok Metropolitan Police	"for offering to pay policemen extra cash if the policemen refuse to take bribes"	
Literature	Mark Dingemanse, Francisco Torreira, and Nick J. Enfield	"for discovering that the word huh? (or its equivalent) seems to exist in every human language – and for not being completely sure why"	
Management	Gennaro Bernile, Vineet Bhagwat, and P. Raghavendra Rau	"for discovering that many business leaders developed during childhood a fondness for risk-taking, when they experienced natural disasters (such as earthquakes, volcanic eruptions, tsunamis, and wildfires) that – for them – had no dire personal consequences"	
Mathematics	Elisabeth Oberzaucher and Karl Grammer	"for trying to use mathematical techniques to determine whether and how Moulay Ismael the Bloodthirsty, the Sharifian Emperor of Morocco, managed, during the years from 1697 through 1727, to father 888 children."	
Medicine	Hajime Kimata	"for experiments to study the biomedical benefits or biomedical consequences of intense kissing (and other intimate, interpersonal activities)"	
Medicine	Jaroslava Durdiaková, Peter Celec, Natália Kamodyová, Tatiana Sedláčková, Gabriela Repiská, Barbara Sviežená, and Gabriel Minárik	"for experiments to study the biomedical benefits or biomedical consequences of intense kissing (and other intimate, interpersonal activities)"	
Physics	Patricia Yang, David Hu, and Jonathan Pham, Jerome Choo	"for testing the biological principle that nearly all mammals empty their bladders in about 21 seconds (plus or minus 13 seconds)"	
Physiology and Entomology	Justin Schmidt	"for painstakingly creating the Schmidt Sting Pain Index, which rates the relative pain people feel when stung by various insects"	
Physiology and Entomology	Michael L. Smith	"for carefully arranging for honey bees to sting him repeatedly on 25 different locations on his body, to learn which locations are the least painful (the skull, middle toe tip, and upper arm), and which are the most painful (the nostril, upper lip, and penis shaft)"	

== 2016 ==
The ceremony took place on 22 September 2016.

Category	Winner(s)	Rationale	Refs
Reproduction	Ahmed Shafik^{†}	"for studying the effects of wearing polyester, cotton, or wool trousers on the sex life of rats, and for conducting similar tests with human males"	
Economics	Mark Avis, Sarah Forbes, and Shelagh Ferguson	"for assessing the perceived personalities of rocks, from a sales and marketing perspective"	
Physics	Gábor Horváth, Miklós Blahó, György Kriska, Ramón Hegedüs, Balázs Gerics, Róbert Farkas, Susanne Åkesson, Péter Malik, and Hansruedi Wildermuth	"for discovering why white-haired horses are the most horsefly-proof horses, and for discovering why dragonflies are fatally attracted to black tombstones"	
Chemistry	Volkswagen	"for solving the problem of excessive automobile pollution emissions by automatically, electromechanically producing fewer emissions whenever the cars are being tested"	
Medicine	Christoph Helmchen, Carina Palzer, Thomas Münte, Silke Anders, and Andreas Sprenger	"for discovering that if you have an itch on the left side of your body, you can relieve it by looking into a mirror and scratching the right side of your body (and vice versa)."	
Psychology	Evelyne Debey, Maarten De Schryver, Gordon Logan, Kristina Suchotzki, and Bruno Verschuere	"for asking a thousand liars how often they lie, and for deciding whether to believe those answers"	
Peace	Gordon Pennycook, James Allan Cheyne, Nathaniel Barr, Derek Koehler, and Jonathan Fugelsang	"for their scholarly study called On the Reception and Detection of Pseudo-Profound Bullshit"	
Biology	Charles Foster	"for living in the wild as, at different times, a badger, an otter, a deer, a fox, and a bird"	
Biology	Thomas Thwaites	"for creating prosthetic extensions of his limbs that allowed him to move in the manner of, and spend time roaming hills in the company of, goats"	
Literature	Fredrik Sjöberg	"for his three-volume autobiographical work about the pleasures of collecting flies that are dead, and flies that are not yet dead"	
Perception	Atsuki Higashiyama and Kohei Adachi	"for investigating whether things look different when you bend over and view them between your legs"	

== 2017 ==
The ceremony took place on 14 September 2017.

Category	Winner(s)	Rationale	Refs
Physics	Marc-Antoine Fardin	"for using fluid dynamics to probe the question Can a Cat Be Both a Solid and a Liquid?"	
Peace	Milo Puhan, Alex Suarez, Christian Lo Cascio, Alfred Zahn, Markus Heitz, and Otto Braendli	"for demonstrating that regular playing of a didgeridoo is an effective treatment for obstructive sleep apnoea and snoring"	
Economics	Matthew Rockloff and Nancy Greer	"for their experiments to see how contact with a live crocodile affects a person's willingness to gamble"	
Anatomy	James Heathcote	"for his medical research study Why Do Old Men Have Big Ears?"	
Biology	Kazunori Yoshizawa, Rodrigo Ferreira, Yoshitaka Kamimura, and Charles Lienhard	"for their discovery of a female penis, and a male vagina, in a cave insect"	(Note: The short video acceptance speech for the award was filmed in a cave.)
Fluid Dynamics	Jiwon Han	"for studying the dynamics of liquid-sloshing, to learn what happens when a person walks backwards while carrying a cup of coffee"	(Note: Jiwon Han was a high school student at Korean Minjok Leadership Academy when he wrote the paper.)
Nutrition	Fernanda Ito, Enrico Bernard, and Rodrigo Torres	"for the first scientific report of human blood in the diet of the hairy-legged vampire bat"	
Medicine	Jean-Pierre Royet, David Meunier, Nicolas Torquet, Anne-Marie Mouly, and Tao Jiang	"for using advanced brain-scanning technology to measure the extent to which some people are disgusted by cheese"	
Cognition	Matteo Martini, Ilaria Bufalari, Maria Antonietta Stazi, and Salvatore Maria Aglioti	"for demonstrating that many identical twins cannot tell themselves apart visually"	
Obstetrics	Marisa López-Teijón, Álex García-Faura, Alberto Prats-Galino, and Luis Pallarés Aniorte	"for showing that a developing human fetus responds more strongly to music that is played electromechanically inside the mother's vagina than to music that is played electromechanically on the mother's belly"	

== 2018 ==
The ceremony took place on 13 September 2018.

Category	Winner(s)	Rationale	Refs
Medicine	Marc Mitchell and David Wartinger	"for using roller coaster rides to try to hasten the passage of kidney stones"	
Anthropology	Tomas Persson, Gabriela-Alina Sauciuc, and Elainie Madsen	"for collecting evidence, in a zoo, that chimpanzees imitate humans about as often, and about as well, as humans imitate chimpanzees"	
Biology	Paul Becher, Sebastien Lebreton, Erika Wallin, Erik Hedenstrom, Felipe Borrero-Echeverry, Marie Bengtsson, Volker Jorger, and Peter Witzgall	"for demonstrating that wine experts can reliably identify, by smell, the presence of a single fly in a glass of wine"	
Chemistry	Paula Romão, Adília Alarcão and the late César Viana	"for measuring the degree to which human saliva is a good cleaning agent for dirty surfaces"	
Medical Education	Akira Horiuchi	"for the medical report Colonoscopy in the Sitting Position: Lessons Learned From Self-Colonoscopy"	
Literature	Thea Blackler, Rafael Gomez, Vesna Popovic and M. Helen Thompson	"for documenting that most people who use complicated products do not read the instruction manual"	
Nutrition	James Cole	"for calculating that the caloric intake from a human-cannibalism diet is significantly lower than the caloric intake from most other traditional meat diets"	
Peace	Francisco Alonso, Cristina Esteban, Andrea Serge, Maria-Luisa Ballestar, Jaime Sanmartín, Constanza Calatayud, and Beatriz Alamar	"for measuring the frequency, motivation, and effects of shouting and cursing while driving an automobile"	
Reproductive Medicine	John Barry, Bruce Blank, and Michel Boileau	"for using postage stamps to test whether the male sexual organ is functioning properly—as described in their study Nocturnal Penile Tumescence Monitoring With Stamps"	
Economics	Lindie Hanyu Liang, Douglas Brown, Huiwen Lian, Samuel Hanig, D. Lance Ferris, and Lisa Keeping	"for investigating whether it is effective for employees to use Voodoo dolls to retaliate against abusive bosses"	

== 2019 ==
Video of the 2019 Ceremony

The ceremony took place on 12 September 2019.

Category	Winner(s)	Rationale	Refs
Medicine	Silvano Gallus	"for collecting evidence that pizza might protect against illness and death, if the pizza is made and eaten in Italy"	
Medical Education	Karen Pryor and Theresa McKeon	"for using a simple animal-training technique—called clicker training—to help new doctors acquire basic surgical skills"	
Biology	Ling-Jun Kong, Herbert Crepaz, Agnieszka Górecka, Aleksandra Urbanek, Rainer Dumke, and Tomasz Paterek	"for discovering that dead magnetized cockroaches behave differently than living magnetized cockroaches"	
Anatomy	Roger Mieusset and Bourras Bengoudifa	"for measuring scrotal temperature asymmetry in naked and clothed postmen in France"	
Chemistry	Shigeru Watanabe, Mineko Ohnishi, Kaori Imai, Eiji Kawano, and Seiji Igarashi	"for estimating the total saliva volume produced per day by a typical five-year-old child"	(Note: The award ceremony was attended by Shiguru Watanabe and his adult sons, who were some of the subjects of the study when they were children 35 years prior.)
Engineering	Iman Farahbakhsh	"for inventing a diaper-changing machine for use on human infants"	
Economics	Habip Gedik, Timothy A. Voss, and Andreas Voss	"for testing which country's paper money is best at transmitting dangerous bacteria"	
Peace	Ghada A. bin Saif, Alexandru Papoiu, Liliana Banari, Francis McGlone, Shawn G. Kwatra, Yiong-Huak Chan, and Gil Yosipovitch	"for trying to measure the pleasurability of scratching an itch"	
Psychology	Fritz Strack	"for discovering that holding a pen in one's mouth makes one smile, which makes one happier – and for then discovering that it does not"	
Physics	Patricia Yang, Alexander Lee, Miles Chan, Alynn Martin, Ashley Edwards, Scott Carver, and David Hu	"for studying how, and why, wombats make cube-shaped poo"	

== 2020 ==
The ceremony took place on 17 September 2020 and was webcast.

Category	Winner(s)	Rationale	Refs
Acoustics	Stephan Reber, Takeshi Nishimura, Judith Janisch, Mark Robertson, and Tecumseh Fitch,	"for inducing a female Chinese alligator to bellow in an airtight chamber filled with helium-enriched air"	
Economics	Christopher Watkins, Juan David Leongómez, Jeanne Bovet, Agnieszka Żelaźniewicz, Max Korbmacher, Marco Antônio Corrêa Varella, Ana Maria Fernandez, Danielle Wagstaff, and Samuela Bolgan	"for trying to quantify the relationship between different countries' national income inequality and the average amount of mouth-to-mouth kissing"	
Entomology	Richard Vetter	"for collecting evidence that many entomologists (scientists who study insects) are afraid of spiders, which are not insects"	
Management	Xi Guang-An, Mo Tian-Xiang, Yang Kang-Sheng, Yang Guang-Sheng, and Ling Xian Si	"five professional hitmen in Guangxi, China, who managed a contract for a hit job (a murder performed for money) in the following way: After accepting payment to perform the murder, Xi Guang-An then instead subcontracted the task to Mo Tian-Xiang, who then instead subcontracted the task to Yang Kang-Sheng, who then instead subcontracted the task to Yang Guang-Sheng, who then instead subcontracted the task to Ling Xian-Si, with each subsequently enlisted hitman receiving a smaller percentage of the fee, and nobody actually performing a murder"	
Materials Science	Metin Eren, Michelle Bebber, James Norris, Alyssa Perrone, Ashley Rutkoski, Michael Wilson, and Mary Ann Raghanti	"for showing that knives manufactured from frozen human feces do not work well"	
Medicine	Nienke Vulink, Damiaan Denys, and Arnoud van Loon	"for diagnosing a long-unrecognized medical condition: Misophonia, the distress at hearing other people make chewing sounds"	
Medical Education	Jair Bolsonaro of Brazil, Boris Johnson of the United Kingdom, Narendra Modi of India, Andrés Manuel López Obrador of Mexico, Alexander Lukashenko of Belarus, Donald Trump of the United States, Recep Tayyip Erdoğan of Turkey, Vladimir Putin of Russia, and Gurbanguly Berdimuhamedow of Turkmenistan	"for using the Covid-19 viral pandemic to teach the world that politicians can have a more immediate effect on life and death than scientists and doctors can"	
Peace	The governments of India and Pakistan	"for having their diplomats surreptitiously ring each other's doorbells in the middle of the night, and then run away before anyone had a chance to answer the door"	
Physics	Ivan Maksymov and Andrey Pototsky	"for determining, experimentally, what happens to the shape of a living earthworm when one vibrates the earthworm at high frequency"	
Psychology	Miranda Giacomin and Nicholas Rule	"for devising a method to identify narcissists by examining their eyebrows"	

== 2021 ==
The 31st First Annual Ig Nobel Prize ceremony took place on Thursday, 9 September 2021 and was webcast.

Category	Winner(s)	Rationale	Refs
Biology	Susanne Schötz, Robert Eklund, and Joost van de Weijer	"for analyzing variations in purring, chirping, chattering, trilling, tweedling, murmuring, meowing, moaning, squeaking, hissing, yowling, howling, growling, and other modes of cat–human communication"	
Ecology	Leila Satari, Alba Guillén, Àngela Vidal-Verdú, and Manuel Porcar	"for using genetic analysis to identify the different species of bacteria that reside in wads of discarded chewing gum stuck on pavements in various countries"	
Chemistry	Jörg Wicker, Nicolas Krauter, Bettina Derstroff, Christof Stönner, Efstratios Bourtsoukidis, Achim Edtbauer, Jochen Wulf, Thomas Klüpfel, Stefan Kramer, and Jonathan Williams	"for chemically analyzing the air inside movie theaters, to test whether the odors produced by an audience reliably indicate the levels of violence, sex, antisocial behavior, drug use, and bad language in the movie the audience is watching"	
Economics	Pavlo Blavatskyy	"for discovering that the obesity of a country's politicians may be a good indicator of that country's corruption"	
Medicine	Olcay Cem Bulut, Dare Oladokun, Burkard Lippert, and Ralph Hohenberger	"for demonstrating that sexual orgasms can be as effective as decongestant medicines at improving nasal breathing"	
Peace	Ethan Beseris, Steven Naleway, and David Carrier	"for testing the hypothesis that humans evolved beards to protect themselves from punches to the face"	
Physics	Alessandro Corbetta, Jasper Meeusen, Chung-min Lee, Roberto Benzi, and Federico Toschi	"for conducting experiments to learn why pedestrians do not constantly collide with other pedestrians"	
Kinetics	Hisashi Murakami, Claudio Feliciani, Yuta Nishiyama, and Katsuhiro Nishinari	"for conducting experiments to learn why pedestrians do sometimes collide with other pedestrians"	
Entomology	John Mulrennan, Jr., Roger Grothaus, Charles Hammond, and Jay Lamdin	"for their research study A New Method of Cockroach Control on Submarines"	
Transportation	Robin Radcliffe, Mark Jago, Peter Morkel, Estelle Morkel, Pierre du Preez, Piet Beytell, Birgit Kotting, Bakker Manuel, Jan Hendrik du Preez, Michele Miller, Julia Felippe, Stephen Parry, and Robin Gleed	"for determining by experiment whether it is safer to transport an airborne rhinoceros upside-down"	

== 2022 ==
The 32nd First Annual Ig Nobel Prize ceremony took place on Thursday, 15 September 2022, and was presented in a webcast format.

Category	Winner(s)	Rationale	Refs
Applied Cardiology	Eliska Prochazkova, Elio Sjak-Shie, Friederike Behrens, Daniel Lindh, and Mariska Kret	"for seeking and finding evidence that when new romantic partners meet for the first time, and feel attracted to each other, their heart rates synchronize"	
Literature	Eric Martínez, Francis Mollica, and Edward Gibson	"for analyzing what makes legal documents unnecessarily difficult to understand"	
Biology	Solimary García-Hernández and Glauco Machado	"for studying whether and how constipation affects the mating prospects of scorpions"	
Medicine	Marcin Jasiński, Martyna Maciejewska, Anna Brodziak, Michał Górka, Kamila Skwierawska, Wiesław Jędrzejczak, Agnieszka Tomaszewska, Grzegorz Basak, and Emilian Snarski	"for showing that when patients undergo some forms of toxic chemotherapy, they suffer fewer harmful side effects when ice cream replaces one traditional component of the procedure"	
Engineering	Gen Matsuzaki, Kazuo Ohuchi, Masaru Uehara, Yoshiyuki Ueno, and Goro Imura	"for trying to discover the most efficient way for people to use their fingers when turning a knob"	
Art History	Peter de Smet and Nicholas Hellmuth	"for their study A Multidisciplinary Approach to Ritual Enema Scenes on Ancient Maya Pottery"	
Physics	Frank Fish, Zhi-Ming Yuan, Minglu Chen, Laibing Jia, Chunyan Ji, and Atilla Incecik	"for trying to understand how ducklings manage to swim in formation"	
Peace	Junhui Wu, Szabolcs Számadó, Pat Barclay, Bianca Beersma, Terence Dores Cruz, Sergio Lo Iacono, Annika Nieper, Kim Peters, Wojtek Przepiorka, Leo Tiokhin and Paul Van Lange	"for developing an algorithm to help gossipers decide when to tell the truth and when to lie"	
Economics	Alessandro Pluchino, Alessio Emanuele Biondo, and Andrea Rapisarda	"for explaining, mathematically, why success most often goes not to the most talented people, but instead to the luckiest"	
Safety Engineering	Magnus Gens	"for developing a moose crash-test dummy"	

== 2023 ==
The 33rd First Annual Ig Nobel Prize ceremony took place on Thursday, 14 September 2023, and was presented in webcast.

Category	Winner(s)	Rationale	Refs
Chemistry and Geology	Jan Zalasiewicz	"for explaining why many scientists like to lick rocks"	
Literature	Chris Moulin, Nicole Bell, Merita Turunen, Arina Baharin, and Akira O'Connor	"for studying the sensations people feel when they repeat a single word many, many, many, many, many, many, many times"	
Nutrition	Homei Miyashita and Hiromi Nakamura	"for experiments to determine how electrified chopsticks and drinking straws can change the taste of food"	
Medicine	Christine Pham, Bobak Hedayati, Kiana Hashemi, Ella Csuka, Tiana Mamaghani, Margit Juhasz, Jamie Wikenheiser, and Natasha Mesinkovska	"for using cadavers to explore whether there is an equal number of hairs in each of a person's two nostrils"	
Mechanical Engineering	Te Faye Yap, Zhen Liu, Anoop Rajappan, Trevor Shimokusu, and Daniel Preston	"for re-animating dead spiders to use as mechanical gripping tools"	
Public Health	Seung-min Park	"for inventing the Stanford Toilet, a device that uses a variety of technologies – including a urinalysis dipstick test strip, a computer vision system for defecation analysis, an anal-print sensor paired with an identification camera, and a telecommunications link – to monitor and quickly analyze the substances that humans excrete"	
Physics	Bieito Fernández Castro, Marian Peña, Enrique Nogueira, Miguel Gilcoto, Esperanza Broullón, Antonio Comesaña, Damien Bouffard, Alberto C. Naveira Garabato, and Beatriz Mouriño-Carballido	"for measuring the extent to which ocean-water mixing is affected by the sexual activity of anchovies"	
Education	Katy Tam, Cyanea Poon, Victoria Hui, Wijnand van Tilburg, Christy Wong, Vivian Kwong, Gigi Yuen, and Christian Chan	"for methodically studying the boredom of teachers and students"	
Communication	María José Torres-Prioris, Diana López-Barroso, Estela Càmara, Sol Fittipaldi, Lucas Sedeño, Agustín Ibáñez, Marcelo Berthier, and Adolfo García	"for studying the mental activities of people who are expert at speaking backward"	
Psychology	Stanley Milgram, Leonard Bickman, and Lawrence Berkowitz	"for experiments on a city street to see how many passersby stop to look upward when they see strangers looking upward"	

== 2024 ==
The 34th First Annual Ig Nobel Prize ceremony took place on Thursday, 12 September 2024, and was held at the Massachusetts Institute of Technology.

Category	Winner(s)	Rationale	Refs
Anatomy	Marjolaine Willems, Quentin Hennocq, Sara Tunon de Lara, Nicolas Kogane, Vincent Fleury, Romy Rayssiguier, Juan José Cortés Santander, Roberto Requena, Julien Stirnemann, and Roman Hossein Khonsari	"for studying whether the hair on the heads of most people in the northern hemisphere swirls in the same direction (clockwise or counter-clockwise?) as hair on the heads of most people in the southern hemisphere."	
Biology	Fordyce Ely^{†} and William E. Petersen^{†}	"for exploding a paper bag next to a cat that's standing on the back of a cow, to explore how and when cows spew their milk"	
Botany	Jacob White and Felipe Yamashita	"for finding evidence that some real plants imitate the shapes of neighboring artificial plastic plants"	
Chemistry	Tess Heeremans, Antoine Deblais, Daniel Bonn, and Sander Woutersen	"for using chromatography to separate drunk and sober worms"	
Demography	Saul Justin Newman	"for detective work to discover that many of the people famous for having the longest lives lived in places that had lousy birth-and-death recordkeeping"	
Medicine	Lieven A. Schenk, Tahmine Fadai, and Christian Büchel	"for demonstrating that fake medicine that causes painful side-effects can be more effective than fake medicine that does not cause painful side-effects"	
Peace	B. F. Skinner^{†}	"for experiments to see the feasibility of housing live pigeons inside missiles to guide the flight paths of the missiles"	
Physics	James C. Liao	"for demonstrating and explaining the swimming abilities of a dead trout"	
Physiology	Ryo Okabe, Toyofumi F. Chen-Yoshikawa, Yosuke Yoneyama, Yuhei Yokoyama, Satona Tanaka, Akihiko Yoshizawa, Wendy L. Thompson, Gokul Kannan, Eiji Kobayashi, Hiroshi Date, and Takanori Takebe	"for discovering that many mammals are capable of breathing through their anus"	
Probability	František Bartoš, Eric-Jan Wagenmakers, Alexandra Sarafoglou, Henrik Godmann, and many colleagues	"for showing, both in theory and by 350,757 experiments, that when you flip a coin, it tends to land on the same side as it started"	

== 2025 ==
The 35th First Annual Ig Nobel Prize ceremony took place on Thursday, 18 September 2025, and was held at Boston University.

Category	Winner(s)	Rationale	Refs
Aviation	Francisco Sánchez, Mariana Melcón, Carmi Korine, and Berry Pinshow	"for studying whether ingesting alcohol can impair bats' ability to fly and also their ability to echolocate"	
Biology	Tomoki Kojima, Kazato Oishi, Yasushi Matsubara, Yuki Uchiyama, Yoshihiko Fukushima, Naoto Aoki, Say Sato, Tatsuaki Masuda, Junichi Ueda, Hiroyuki Hirooka, and Katsutoshi Kino	"for their experiments to learn whether cows painted with zebra-like striping can avoid being bitten by flies"	(Note: This prize builds on research by Horváth et al. (2010), the authors of whom were awarded the 2016 Ig Nobel Physics Prize.)
Chemistry	Rotem Naftalovich, Daniel Naftalovich, and Frank Greenway	"for experiments to test whether eating Teflon is a good way to increase food volume and hence satiety without increasing calorie content."	
Engineering design	Vikash Kumar and Sarthak Mittal	"for analyzing, from an engineering design perspective, how foul-smelling shoes affect the good experience of using a shoe-rack"	
Literature	William B. Bean	"for persistently recording and analyzing the rate of growth of one of his fingernails over a period of 35 years"	
Nutrition	Daniele Dendi, Gabriel H. Segniagbeto, Roger Meek, and Luca Luiselli	"for studying the extent to which a certain kind of lizard chooses to eat certain kinds of pizza"	
Peace	Fritz Renner, Inge Kersbergen, Matt Field, and Jessica Werthmann	"for showing that drinking alcohol sometimes improves a person's ability to speak in a foreign language"	
Pediatrics	Julie Mennella and Gary Beauchamp	"for studying what a nursing baby experiences when the baby's mother eats garlic"	
Physics	Giacomo Bartolucci, Daniel Maria Busiello, Matteo Ciarchi, Alberto Corticelli, Ivan Di Terlizzi, Fabrizio Olmeda, Davide Revignas, and Vincenzo Maria Schimmenti	"for discoveries about the physics of pasta sauce, especially the phase transition that can lead to clumping, which can be a cause of unpleasantness"	
Psychology	Marcin Zajenkowski and Gilles Gignac	"for investigating what happens when you tell narcissists – or anyone else – that they are intelligent"	

== 2026 ==
The theme of this year's Ig Nobel Prize ceremony, was fungi.

The 36th First Annual Ig Nobel Prize ceremony took place on Thursday, September 3, 2026, at 7:00 pm CET and was held at Kongresshaus Zürich, Claridenstrasse 5, Zürich, Switzerland.

Category	Winner(s)	Rationale	Research	Refs
Biomechanics	Matilda Brindle, Catherine Talbot, Stuart West (UK, USA)	"Devising a more precise definition of kissing – non-agonistic interactions involving directed, intraspecific, oral-oral contact with some movement of the lips/mouthparts and no food transfer" – in ants, polar bears, and humans.	A comparative approach to the evolution of kissing	
Economics	Paul Piff, Daniel Stancato, Stephane Cote, Rodolfo Mendoza-Denton, Dacher Keltner (USA, Mexico, Canada)	"Amassing evidence that upper-class people are more likely to snatch from a children's candy, and engage in other kinds of unethical behavior."	Higher social class predicts increased unethical behavior	
Chemistry	Sanchari Banerjee, Nathan Coussens, Francois-Xavier Gallat, Nitish Sathyanarayanan, Jandhyam Srikanth, Koichiro Yagi, James Gray, Steven Tobe, Barbara Stay, Leonard Chavas, Sumabramanian Ramaswamy (India, France, Japan, USA)	"Discovering that milk proteins from viviparous cockroaches contains 3 times as much energy as milk proteins than from cows."	Structure of heterogeneous, glycosylated, lipid-bound, in vivo-grown protein crystal at atomic resolution from the viviparous cockroach Diploptera punctata.	
Medicine	Tokuji Unno, accepted by Dr. Miki Takahara (Japan)	for the study called "How to Blow the Nose — An Aerodynamic Study of the Nose Blowing"	How to Blow the Nose – An Aerodynamic Study of the Nose-Blowing	
Biology	Joao Miguel Alvez-Nunes, Adriano Fellone, Selma Maria Almeida-Santos, Carlos Roberto de Medeiros, Ivan Sazima, Otávio Augusto Vuolo Marques (Brazil, Australia)	"Gently stepping on various parts of various venomous snakes repeatedly, at various temperatures, at various times of day – to try to learn what does and what does not induce a venomous snake to bite a human."	Study of defensive behavior of a venomous snake as a new approach to understand snakebite	
Physics	Randy Hurd, Zhao Pan, Tadd Truscott, Kaveeshan Thurairajah (Canada, USA, China, Saudi Arabia)	"Theoretical and experimental attempts to design a splash-free urinal."	Splash-free urinals for global sustainability and accessibility: Design through physics and differential equations	
Technology	Justin Puma, Zhen Yang, Evan Johnston, Zixin Zhang, Xiaoyi Lan, Lingzhi Zhang, Hongyu Hou, Zixin He, Ali Afify, Megan Creighton, Jianyu Li, and Changhong Cao (China, Canada, USA, Egypt)	"Pioneering the use of mosquito proboscises as high-resolution 3D printing nozzles, a process called Necroprinting."	3D necroprinting: Leveraging biotic material as the nozzle for 3D printing	
Olfaction	Ilona Croy, Tomasz Frackowiak, Thomas Hummel, and Agnieszka Sorokowska (Poland, Germany, Sweden)	"Collecting evidence that babies smell wonderful to their parents but teenagers do not."	Babies Smell Wonderful to Their Parents, Teenagers Do Not: an Exploratory Questionnaire Study on Children's Age and Personal Odor Ratings in a Polish Sample	
Peace	Jaimie Arona Krems, Rebecka Hahnel-Peeters, Laureon Merrie, Keelah Williams, and Daniel Sznycer (USA, Argentina, Australia)	"We value friends who are vicious to people we dislike"	Sometimes we want vicious friends: People have nuanced preferences for how they want their friends to behave toward them versus others	
Soil Science	Franz Bender, Marcel van der Heijden, Atlant Bieri, and Pia Viviani (Switzerland, The Netherlands, Germany)	"Burying 1,000 identical pairs of underpants in more than 25 countries then digging them up after 2 months"	Soil health assessment using buried cotton underpants with the help of 1000 citizen scientists	

== 2027 ==
The 37th First Annual Ig Nobel Prize ceremony will be held on September 5, 2027, at the Elizabeth Hall in Antwerp, Flanders, Belgium .

== People who received multiple Ig Nobel Prizes ==
- Jacques Benveniste, 1991 and 1998 Chemistry
- Joseph Keller, 1999 and 2012 Physics
- Toshiyuki Nakagaki and Atsushi Tero, 2008 Cognitive Science and 2010 Transportation Planning
- Alessandro Pluchino and Andrea Rapisarda, 2010 Management and 2022 Economics
- Alexander Lukashenko, 2013 Peace and 2020 Medical Education
- David Hu and Patricia Yang, 2015 and 2019 Physics

== Ig Nobel Prize winners who also received the Nobel Prize ==
- Andre Geim, 2000 Ig Nobel Prize in Physics and 2010 Nobel Prize in Physics.
