= Michele Swanson =

American microbiologist

Michele Somes Swanson
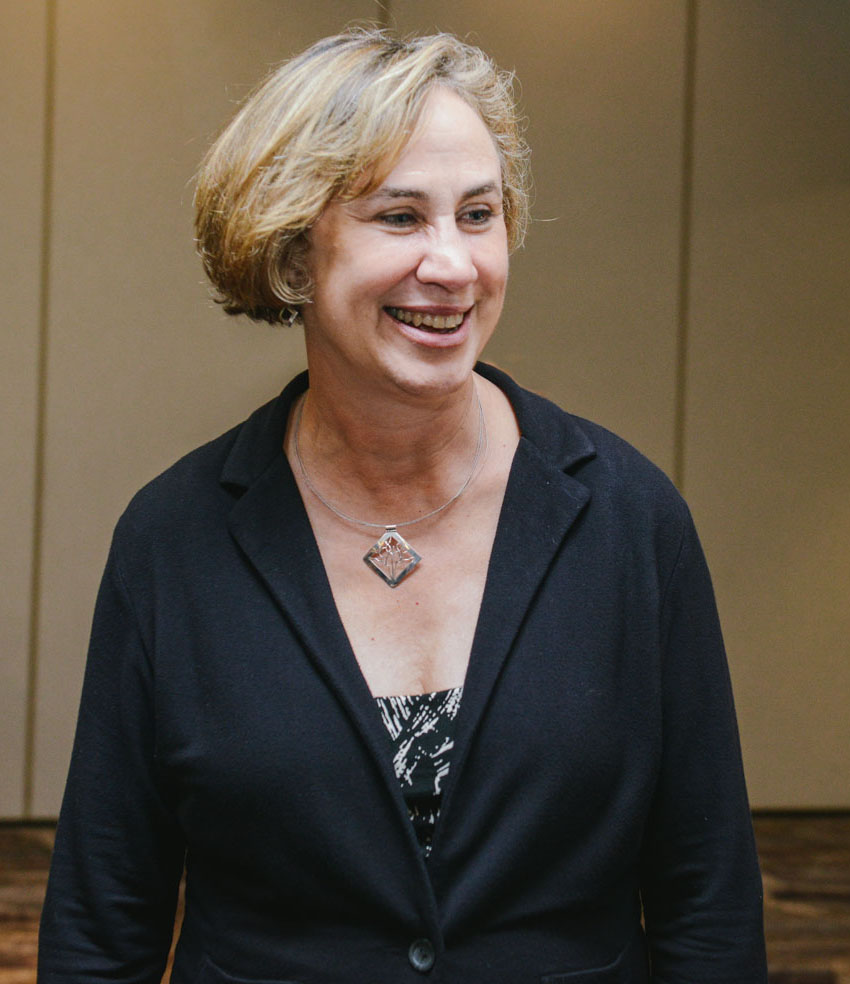
- Michele Swanson at ASM Microbe 2019
- Education: Harvard University; Yale University; Columbia University
- Scientific career
- Workplaces: University of Michigan
- Thesis: Analysis of SPT4, SPT5, and SPT6 interactions and effects on transcription in yeast (1991)

Michele S. Swanson is an American biologist who is a professor of microbiology at the University of Michigan. She has investigated the water-borne pathogen Legionella pneumophila. Swanson is interested in the metabolic cues that underpin the virulence of L. pneumophila and how it is transmitted to humans. She served as president of the American Society for Microbiology from 2018-2019.

== Early life and education ==
Swanson grew up in Michigan, one of six children in her family. Her father was the first member of his family to attend university. Swanson spent her summer holidays playing sports at Michigan summer camps, where she played field hockey and softball. Swanson eventually earned her bachelor's degree at Yale University, where she worked as a counsellor for freshmen at Davenport College. Swanson was inspired by John Trinkaus to pursue a career in experimental biology. After graduating from Yale, Swanson joined Rockefeller University as a laboratory technician. She moved to Columbia University for her graduate studies, where she earned a master's degree in genetics under the supervision of Marian Carlson. Swanson joined the laboratory of Fred Winston at Harvard University where she completed her doctoral research on the interactions of various transcription factors with yeast. She was a postdoctoral researcher at Tufts Medical Center, where she first became interested in Legionella pneumophila.

== Research and career ==
In 1996, Swanson joined the faculty at the University of Michigan. Swanson has studied how Legionella pneumophila remains virulent in different environments. She identified that the pathogen alternates between different cell types, one which is highly replicative and another which is highly transmissible that is primed to invade naïve hosts. After extended periods of starvation, L. pneumophila forms a highly infectious form. Swanson showed that L. pneumophila achieves these distinct cell types by coupling cellular differentiation to the metabolic state.

L. pneumophila can cause sporadic outbreaks of Legionnaires' disease. This was responsible for the Flint water crisis that started in 2014. Swanson has studied the mechanisms that permit L. pneumophila to persist in water, looking to create a microbiology based system to assess the safety of public water systems.

== Academic service ==
Swanson serves as the director of postdoctoral studies at the University of Michigan Medical School and was a part of the President's Advisory Commission on Women's Issues at the University of Michigan. She was elected president of the American Society for Microbiology in 2018 and hosts the ASM podcast This Week in Microbiology. She was elected Fellow of the American Association for the Advancement of Science in 2019.

== Selected publications ==
- Swanson MS; Isberg RR (1 September 1995). "Association of Legionella pneumophila with the macrophage endoplasmic reticulum". Infection and Immunity. 63 (9): 3609–3620. ISSN 0019-9567. PMC 173501. PMID 7642298. Wikidata Q35438605.
- Ari B Molofsky; Brenda G Byrne; Natalie N Whitfield; Cressida A Madigan; Etsu T Fuse; Kazuhiro Tateda; Michele S Swanson (10 April 2006). "Cytosolic recognition of flagellin by mouse macrophages restricts Legionella pneumophila infection". Journal of Experimental Medicine. 203 (4): 1093–1104. doi:10.1084/jem.20051659. ISSN 0022-1007. PMC 1584282. PMID 16606669. Wikidata Q35060264.
- Ari B. Molofsky; Michele S. Swanson (1 July 2004). "Differentiate to thrive: lessons from the Legionella pneumophila life cycle". Molecular Microbiology. 53 (1): 29–40. doi:10.1111/j.1365-2958.2004.04129.x. ISSN 0950-382X. PMID 15225301. Wikidata Q35822038.
