= Yuri Struchkov =

Russian/Soviet chemist (1926–1995)

Yuri Struchkov Юрий Стручков
- Born: 28 July 1926; Moscow, USSR
- Died: 16 August 1995 (aged 69); Charleston, South Carolina, U.S.
- Education: Moscow State University
- Scientific career
- Fields: Chemistry, X-Ray Crystallography
- Workplaces: Moscow State University; Zelinsky Institute of Organic Chemistry; Nesmeyanov Institute of Organoelement Compounds (1954—1995)

Yuri Timofeevich Struchkov (Russian: Юрий Тимофеевич Стручков) (28 July 1926, Moscow — 16 August 1995, Charleston, South Carolina) was a Russian and Soviet chemist. He was a prominent scientist in the field X-ray crystallography, a Corresponding Member of the Russian Academy of Sciences (1990) and the vice-president of the International Union of Crystallography (1993-1995). Struchkov was the founder and the first Director of the X-Ray Structural Laboratory of Nesmeyanov Institute of Organoelement Compounds and X-Ray Structural Centre of the Russian Academy of Sciences (RAS). He made important contributions to the fields of chemistry and crystallography of organic, organoelement and coordination compounds. As an author and co-author of more than 1000 papers, published between 1980 and 1990, he became the most widely published scientist of the decade. In 2021, the International Union of Crystallography (IUCr) honored his contributions to the field of small molecule structural crystallography, establishing the Struchkov Prize, which is awarded to the young crystallographers at the regular triennial IUCr International Congress of Crystallography.

== Scientific career ==
- In 1948 Struchkov graduated from the MSU Faculty of Chemistry.
- In 1948—1953 he was a working on his Ph.D. thesis under the supervision of professor A.I.Kitaigorodski.
- In 1950 he joined the staff of the Zelinsky Institute of Organic Chemistry (IOCh).
- In 1953 he defended the PhD thesis X-Ray structural study of two addition products of metal salts to unsaturated compounds.
- In 1954—1995 he worked in the Nesmeyanov Institute of Organoelement Compounds (INEOS):
  - in the laboratory headed by A.I.Kitaigorodski (1954–1973)
  - in the diffraction studies group (1973–1977)
  - in the new Laboratory of the X-Ray Structure Analysis (LXRSA) which was founded and headed by him (1977–1995).
- In 1989 Struchkov became the Director of the X-Ray Structural Centre of RAS, which was based on the INEOS LXRSA.
- In 1990 he was elected Corresponding Member of RAS and a member of the executive committee of the International Union of Crystallography (IUCr).
- At the XVI General Assembly of IUCr in 1993 he became the vice-president of the IUCr (1993–1995).

== See also ==
- List of Ig Nobel Prize winners
