= Edward Cussler =

American chemical engineer

- Born: 1940 (age 85–86); United States
- Education: Yale University; University of Wisconsin, Madison
- Known for: Chemical Separation Processes; Membranes; Technical Communication
- Awards: Charles P. Colburn Award, 1975; Fellow of AAAS, 1996; W.K. Lewis Award AIChE, 2001; National Academy of Engineering (2002); Institute Lecture - AIChE, 2014
- Scientific career
- Fields: Chemical Engineer, Materials Science
- Workplaces: University of Minnesota
- Doctoral advisor: Edwin N. Lightfoot

External videos
- “Ed Cussler, 66th AIChE Institute Award Winner, on The Future of The Lecture”

Edward L. Cussler (born 1940) is an American chemical engineer and professor in the department of chemical engineering and materials science at the University of Minnesota. He is internationally known for his work in fluid mechanics, transport phenomena, and gas separations, especially in the areas of membranes and gas sorption. Cussler is an author of more than 250 academic papers, dozens of patents, and five books including the acclaimed text: “Diffusion” (Cambridge, 2009, 3rd Edition). He has served as director, vice president and president of the American Institute of Chemical Engineers (AIChE, 1989–1995), and he presented the AIChE Institute Lecture in 2014. Cussler and his wife Betsy, a former teacher at Edina High School, are long-time residents of Minneapolis, Minnesota.

== Early life and education ==
Cussler took a B.E. degree (with honors) at Yale University in 1961 followed by an M.S. at the University of Wisconsin in 1963. He continued towards a PhD also at Wisconsin, 1965, with his thesis entitled, "Multicomponent Diffusion in Macromolecules," where he was a student of Edwin N. Lightfoot. Throughout his time in school, Ed developed a love for activity with interests in running, swimming and cycling. His hobbies include cycle touring with his wife, and he has run the Boston Marathon many times.

After his PhD, he completed postdoctoral studies at the University of Wisconsin in chemical engineering. Subsequent post-doctoral studies were completed in physical chemistry at the University of Adelaide, South Australia, and Yale University in Connecticut. In 1967, he was hired as an assistant professor in the department of chemical engineering at Carnegie Mellon University, followed by promotion to associate professor in 1970 and full professor in 1973. During his time at Carnegie Mellon University, he completed a sabbatical year at Unilever in the United Kingdom. In 1980, Ed joined the department of chemical engineering and materials science at the University of Minnesota in Minneapolis. During his time at Minnesota, Ed has taken sabbaticals at MIT and the University of Cambridge.

== Honors ==
Professor Cussler has received numerous honors and awards for teaching and research. He was elected president of the AIChE in 1994. He won the 2001 Warren K. Lewis Award for Chemical Engineering Education from the American Institute of Chemical Engineers. He was inducted into the National Academy of Engineering in 2002, "For pioneering research on membrane transport in chemical and biochemical separation, and for inspiring teaching." He is a Fellow of the American Association for the Advancement of Science and has received honorary doctorates from the Universities of Lund and Nancy.

On a less serious note, he received the Ig Nobel Prize in Chemistry in 2005 for an experiment settling whether people could swim faster or slower in syrup rather than water.

== Journal publications ==
Professor Cussler has authored over 240 journal publications. Representative publications include:

- E.L. Cussler "Membranes which pump", AIChE Journal 17(6), 1300-1303 (1971).
- M.C. Yang, E.L. Cussler "Designing Hollow-Fiber Contactors", AIChE Journal 32(11), 1910-1916 (1986).
- B.W. Reed, M.J. Semmens E.L. Cussler "Membrane Contactors", Membrance Science and Technology 2, 467-498 (1995).
- B. Libby, W.H. Smyrl, E.L. Cussler "Polymer-Zeolite Composite Membranes for Direct Methanol Fuel Cells", AIChE Journal 49(4), 991-1001 (2003).
- M. Malmali, Y. Wei, A. McCormick, E.L. Cussler "Ammonia Synthesis at Reduced Pressure via Reactive Separation", Industrial & Engineering Chemistry Research 55(33), 8922-8932 (2016).

== Books ==
Professor Cussler has authored five books in the field of chemical engineering:

- Cussler, E.L., Diffusion, Cambridge University Press, first edition, 1984; second edition, 1997; Chinese edition, 2002; third edition, 2008.
- Cussler, E. L., and Moggridge, G., Chemical Product Design, Cambridge University Press, 2001; French edition, 2002; Chinese edition, 2003.
- Belter, P., Cussler, E.L., and Hu, W-S., Bioseparations, John Wiley and Sons, New York, 1988.
- Baker, R.W., Cussler, E.L., Eykamp, W., Koros, W.J., Riley, R.L., and Strathmann, H., Membrane Separation Systems, Noyes Data Corp., New Jersey, 1991.
- Cussler, E.L., Multicomponent Diffusion, Elsevier Publishing Company, Amsterdam, 1976.

== See also ==
- List of Ig Nobel Prize winners
