= Helmchen =

Helmchen is a surname of German origin, meaning "little helmet". People with that name include:

- Christoph Helmchen (active 2016), German neurologist, Ig Nobel Prize winner
- Erwin Helmchen (1907-1981), German footballer
- Martin Helmchen (born 1982), German pianist
- Fritjof Helmchen (born 1966), German neuroscientist
