= Chonosuke Okamura =

Japanese palaeontologist

- Born: June 2, 1901
- Died: 1990s(?)
- Occupations: Physician, Pseudoscience researcher
- Known for: pseudopaleontology
- Notable work: presentations of claims he discovered miniature dinosaurs and humans in the fossil record

Chonosuke Okamura (岡村 長之助, Okamura Chōnosuke) was a Japanese amateur paleontologist. In his late 70s, he claimed to have discovered fossils from the Silurian geological period of miniature animals, ranging from dinosaurs to humans, accounting for more than 1000 allegedly extinct "mini-species", each less than 0.25mm in length. He claimed that "There have been no changes in the bodies of mankind since the Silurian period... except for a growth in stature from 3.5 mm to 1,700 mm."

In the 1970s, he visited Japan's paleontology conference several times and applied to present his findings. It was rumored that in 1978 an elderly paleontologist who walked into Okamura's lecture became so angry that he suffered from high blood pressure and died prematurely. Eventually the paleontology conference changed its rules to ban amateurs and Okamura petitioned overseas colleges, finally publishing his research himself in 1983. He was awarded the Ig Nobel Prize for his work in 1996.

== See also ==
- List of Ig Nobel Prize winners
