= Richard Wassersug =

Richard Joel Wassersug (born April 13, 1946) was an Honorary professor in the Department of Cellular and Physiological Sciences at the University of British Columbia. He was also an adjunct professor in the Department of Medical Neuroscience at Dalhousie University with a cross appointment in the Department of Psychology. In addition, he is an adjunct professor at The Australian Research Centre in Sex, Health & Society (ARCSHS), La Trobe University.

== Biography ==
Wassersug received his Bachelor of Arts from Tufts University in geology and biology in 1967 and his PhD from the University of Chicago in Evolutionary Biology in 1973. He became a professor in the Dalhousie University’s Department of Anatomy and Neurobiology in 1986 and Honorary Associate Professor in Dalhousie University’s School of Physiotherapy in 1989. In 2010 he was an honorary visiting professor at the Australian Research Centre in Sex, Health and Society, at La Trobe University.

Wassersug is an outspoken communicator of scientific ideas, having served on CBC Radio’s Maritime Noon Science Panel and as a columnist on The Canadian Discovery Channel's Daily Planet (TV series).

== Research ==
The majority of his scientific career has been spent studying the functional morphology and behavior of anuran larvae. He has published over 150 peer-reviewed papers on these animals. Wassersug’s more recent work focuses on prostate cancer and the psychology of androgen deprivation. His book Androgen Deprivation Therapy: an essential guide for prostate cancer patients and their loved ones (Demos Health) has been through three editions (2014, 2021, 2023).

Wassersug has received funding for his research from the Natural Sciences and Engineering Research Council, the Canadian Institutes of Health Research, Prostate Cancer Canada, the Prostate Cancer Foundation of British Columbia, Nova Scotia Health Research Foundation, the Canadian Space Agency, Parks Canada, and the Dalhousie Medical Research Foundation.

== Awards ==
Wassersug received the Science Communication Award from the Atlantic Provinces Council on the Sciences in 2001. He was also named a Science Champion during the Discovery Awards for Science and Technology in 2003.

He won an Ig Nobel Prize in 2000 for his firsthand report, "On the Comparative Palatability of Some Dry-Season Tadpoles from Costa Rica".

== See also ==
- List of Ig Nobel Prize winners
