= Daniel Bonn =

Dutch physicist (born 1967)

- Born: 1967 (age 58–59)
- Known for: Complex fluids, Wetting, friction
- Awards: Member of the Royal Netherlands Academy of Arts and Sciences, Physica Prize (2021), APS Fellow (2021), Ig Nobel Prize (2024)
- Scientific career
- Fields: Soft matter physics, Fluid mechanics
- Institutions: University of Amsterdam

Daniel Bonn (born 1967) is a Dutch physicist specializing in soft matter and fluid mechanics. He is a professor at the University of Amsterdam (UvA), where he leads the Complex Fluids Group and serves as Director of the Institute of Physics.

== Career ==
Prior to his appointment at UvA, Bonn was a CNRS research director at the École Normale Supérieure in Paris. At UvA, he directs the Van der Waals–Zeeman Institute, overseeing research in complex fluids and interfacial phenomena.

== Research ==
Bonn's research focuses on the physics of complex fluids, including materials such as foams, gels, blood, and emulsions. His work has contributed to understanding phase transitions, flow behavior, and surface interactions of these materials. He has also published on wetting and friction phenomena, with applications in consumer products, biophysics, and materials engineering.

=== Pyramid Stone Transportation ===
In 2014, Bonn and colleagues published a study in Physical Review Letters showing that adding small amounts of water to sand can significantly reduce sliding friction. This research gained widespread media attention for offering a plausible explanation of how ancient Egyptians may have moved massive stones to construct the pyramids using wetted sand to reduce drag.

=== Ig Nobel Prize ===
In 2024, Bonn and collaborators were awarded the Ig Nobel Prize in Chemistry for research using chromatography to separate drunk worms from sober ones. The project modeled active matter dynamics and demonstrated altered movement patterns in intoxicated worms.

=== Fluid Dynamics and Coiling Phenomena ===
Bonn's research has also explored the behavior of viscous fluids, including studies on how dribbling fluids can coil around like ropes. This work has been featured in publications such as Scientific American.

=== MIST Project ===
Bonn is involved in the MIST (Mitigation Strategies for Airborne Infection Control) project, where he contributes his expertise in measuring aerosol persistence and generating artificial aerosols to assess ventilation quality.

== Honors and memberships ==
- Elected Member, Royal Netherlands Academy of Arts and Sciences (2022)
- Physica Prize (2021), awarded by the Dutch Physical Society for contributions to soft matter physics and complex fluids
- Fellow of the American Physical Society (2021), recognized for significant contributions to the mechanics and flow stability of a wide range of simple and complex fluids
