= David Hu =

David Hu may refer to

- David Hu (IIG), cofounder of IIG sentenced to 12 years in prison for fraud
- David Hu (scientist), studied animal urination and defecation
