= Arvid Vatle =

Norwegian doctor

Arvid Vatle (born 23 November 1938) is a Norwegian medical doctor and winner of the 1999 Ig Nobel Prize in Medicine. He won the prize for his research in the containers used by his patients to deliver urine samples.

He was born in Voss Municipality, and took his medical education in West Berlin in 1963. In 1981 he took the doctorate in the history of medicine, again in West Germany. He settled in Sagvåg, working as a physician.

== See also ==
- List of Ig Nobel Prize winners
