= Richard Seed =

American physicist and businessman (1928–2013)

Richard Griffith Seed (May 22, 1928 – November 17, 2013) was an American physicist and businessman best known for forcing a national debate on human cloning in the late 1990s.

== Life and career ==
Seed was born in Chicago, Illinois on May 22, 1928. He graduated from Oak Park and River Forest High School in Illinois before attending Harvard University, earning his undergraduate degree there in 1949. He later received a master's degree, as well as a Ph.D. in physics from Harvard in 1953. His interests soon shifted to the new frontier of biomedicine. In the 1970s, Seed co-founded a company that commercialized a technique for transferring embryos in cattle. Later, he and his brother, Chicago surgeon Randolph Seed, started another company, Fertility & Genetics Research Inc., to help infertile women conceive children using the same technique. These efforts to transplant a human embryo from one woman to an infertile surrogate mother were published in 1984. The cumbersome procedure involved flushing embryos out of the uterus of the egg donor and was soon eclipsed by in-vitro fertilization. Ultimately, the venture failed.

On December 5, 1997, Seed announced that he planned to clone a human being before any federal laws could be enacted to ban the process. Seed's announcement added fuel to the raging ethical debate on human cloning that had been sparked by Ian Wilmut's creation of Dolly the sheep, the first clone obtained from adult cells. Seed's plans were to use the same technique used by the Scottish team. Seed's announcement went against President Clinton's 1997 proposal for a voluntary private moratorium against human cloning. In the media frenzy that followed, the story of a 69-year-old eccentric maverick scientist emerged, but Seed possessed impressive credentials and was not dismissed immediately. While virtually no mainstream scientist believed Seed would succeed, there began a subtle shift in attitudes after Seed made his announcement.

Although he was retired at the time of his announcement to clone the first human, Seed was reported to have dabbled in other ill-fated ventures in the past. He claimed, at one time, to have commitments for $800,000 toward a goal of $2.5 million needed to clone the first human before the year 2000. Seed first said that he was going to make little baby clones for infertile couples. Later, "to defuse criticism that I'm taking advantage of desperate women," he announced that he would first clone himself. He later announced that he would re-create his wife Gloria. "God made man in his own image," he told National Public Radio correspondent Joe Palca in December 1997. He also stated that "God intended for man to become one with God”, and that cloning is the “first serious step in becoming one with God". In a later interview on CNN, Seed elaborated: "Man," he said, "will develop the technology and the science and the capability to have an indefinite life span".

In 1998, the Ig Nobel Prize in economics, a satirical version of the Nobel Memorial Prize in Economics, was awarded to Seed, for which a performance titled The Seedy Opera was held.

Richard Seed died in Hobart, Indiana on November 17, 2013, at the age of 85.

== Selected publications ==
- Buster, J. E.; Bustillo, M.; Thorneycroft, I.; Simon, J. A.; Boyers, S. P.; Marshall, J. R.; Seed, R. G.; Louw, J. A. (1983). "Non-surgical transfer of an in-vivo fertilised donated ovum to an infertility patient". Lancet. 1 (8328): 816–817. doi:10.1016/s0140-6736(83)91868-8. PMID 6132146. S2CID 38672184.
- Buster, J. E.; Bustillo, M.; Thorneycroft, I. H.; Simon, J. A.; Boyers, S. P.; Marshall, J. R.; Louw, J. A.; Seed, R. W.; Seed, R. G. (1983). "Non-surgical transfer of in vivo fertilised donated ova to five infertile women: Report of two pregnancies". Lancet. 2 (8343): 223–224. doi:10.1016/S0140-6736(83)90208-8. PMID 6135059. S2CID 205999689.
- Bustillo, M.; Buster, J. E.; Cohen, S. W.; Thorneycroft, I. H.; Simon, J. A.; Boyers, S. P.; Marshall, J. R.; Seed, R. W.; Louw, J. A.; Seed, R. G. (1984). "Nonsurgical ovum transfer as a treatment in infertile women. Preliminary experience". JAMA: The Journal of the American Medical Association. 251 (9): 1171–1173. doi:10.1001/jama.1984.03340330029018. PMID 6694323.

== See also ==
- List of Ig Nobel Prize winners
