= Ivan R. Schwab =

American ophthalmologist (1948–2025)

Ivan Roy Schwab (January 1948 – December 13, 2025) was a professor of ophthalmology at the University of California Davis School of Medicine.

Schwab completed his undergraduate degree at West Virginia University and received his M.D. from the West Virginia University School of Medicine. He then completed a residency in ophthalmology at California Pacific Medical Center and a fellowship in corneal surgery at University of California San Francisco in 1982. He was a Fellow of the American College of Surgeons. He served as a director on the American Board of Ophthalmology for eight years. He was a member of the editorial boards of the British Journal of Ophthalmology and Cornea.

Schwab served as the director of corneal and external disease services at UC Davis Medical Center. In addition to clinical and teaching duties, he conducted research in biomaterials. His past work includes the development of a bioengineered artificial cornea which can be used to treat patients with severe corneal damage.

In addition to the diagnosis and treatment of ocular disorders, Schwab had an interest in comparative ophthalmology, examining the visual systems of animals such as stomatopods, mysid shrimp, and sharks and published a book on the evolution of the eye. His work on why woodpeckers do not get headaches was honored with an Ig Nobel Prize in 2006.

== See also ==
- List of Ig Nobel Prize winners
