= Akira Horiuchi =

Japanese scientist

- Born: 1961
- Occupation: physician
- Known for: 2018 Ig Nobel prize for self-colonoscopy method

Akira Horiuchi is a Japanese physician, winner of the 2018 Ig Nobel Prize in Medical Education for devising a "self-colonoscopy”.

== Life and career ==
Horiuchi was born and raised near the Komagane, Nagano area, where the trained as a gastroenterologist. In 1999, he began working at the Showa Inan General Hospital in Komagane.

He developed the technique for the self-administered colonoscopy after first using a very thin endoscope down his own throat, and publishing a paper about it in an American scientific journal. He then wondered if something similar could be done with a colonoscope. He devised the technique while sitting in a chair, legs apart, and inserting the scope in his colon. He was trying to find ways to lessen the discomfort that normal colonoscopies can cause, trying a thin camera on himself. The technique was perfected and a research article was published in 2004, explaining the benefits of sitting while doing a colonoscopy, noting that sitting as on a toilet stretched the intestine, reducing discomfort during the procedure. That research would win him the Ig Nobel Prize in 2018.

Horiuchi notes that the procedure he invented can still cause embarrassment for patients and that some don't like it. It was also not 100% effective. The procedure has not entered clinical practice. Horiuchi has tested the method on himself, learning more about what makes colonoscopies uncomfortable, allowing him to better improve his techniques. He also invented a newer method for doing colonoscopies, dubbed the “Komagane method” where patients can register for a colonoscopy in the morning and have it done that same afternoon.

As of 2026, Horiuchi is still working as a gastroenterologist.

=== Ig Nobel win ===
Horiuchi won the 2018 Medical Education prize for the self-colonscopy method. He explains that he was trying to find ways to make colonscopies easier and more comfortable, amid a rise in colorectal cancer rates in Japan. While some might laugh and his Ig Nobel win, he explained that the prize brings attention to research such as his, that might otherwise be ignored. The media attention he received was used to explain the importance of colonoscopies, as part of the effort to reduce cancer rates in the country.
