= John Trinkaus =

American business academic (1925–2017)

John W. Trinkaus (July 17, 1925 – November 11, 2017) was an American business consultant, management and behavior researcher, and engineer. In 2003, Trinkaus was awarded the Ig Nobel Prize in literature for "meticulously collecting data and publishing more than 80 detailed academic reports about things that annoyed him." As a result, his work received mainstream media coverage, with stories appearing in The New York Times, Newsweek, and other media.

== Life and career ==
John W. Trinkaus served in the United States Army Air Forces in World War II. After the war, he studied electrical engineering at New York University and subsequently worked as an engineer for Bendix Aviation, Curtis Wright Corporation, and Sperry Rand before embarking on an academic career. In 1961, Trinkaus obtained a Master's degree in engineering management from Baruch College, City University of New York, followed in 1976 by a doctorate in management from New York University.

Trinkaus taught in the Zicklin School of Business at Baruch College in New York, eventually becoming Professor of Management and Dean, and was a Visiting Distinguished Professor at St. John's University. His research interests included executive education, the history of management thought, and observation of various social practices. In addition to his academic work, Trinkaus also consulted for the Ford Foundation, the Small Business Administration, and the Interracial Council for Business Opportunity. Trinkaus was particularly active in promoting and facilitating minority startups and studied the contribution of African Americans to the history of American management and management thought.

Trinkaus had three children with his wife Irene. He died on November 11, 2017, in New Hyde Park, NY, aged 92.

== Ig Nobel prize ==
In 2003, Trinkaus was awarded the Ig Nobel Prize in literature for "meticulously collecting data and publishing more than 80 detailed academic reports about things that annoyed him." This included, among numerous other things, studies about:

- The number of items people bring to express lines at supermarkets
- How often drivers come to a complete stop at stop signs
- The average wait time to see a doctor at their office
- Taste preferences for brussels sprouts
- How many people pay for the candles in churches
- How many people wear baseball caps with the bill facing backwards

Many of Trinkaus's published articles are terse reports based on observation and counting the occurrence of things. The majority of his articles have been published in two journals, both founded by Robert B. Ammons: Perceptual and Motor Skills and Psychological Reports. He replicated the same studies in different years and generally found that bad habits are getting more widespread with time. Trinkaus's research earned him recognition in the media, including becoming the subject of stories by NPR, The New York Times, Newsweek, and New Scientist.

== See also ==
- List of Ig Nobel Prize winners
