= Christoph Helmchen =

German neurologist

- Awards: Ig Nobel Prize
- Scientific career
- Fields: Neurology
- Workplaces: University of Lübeck

Christoph Helmchen is a German neurologist at University of Lübeck and Ig Nobel Prize winner of 2016 in medicine. Helmchen and colleagues have discovered that if anyone has an itch on the left side of his body, they can relieve it by looking into a mirror and scratching the right side of their body (and vice versa).

== See also ==
- List of Ig Nobel Prize winners
- Itch
