= Gian Vittorio Caprara =

Italian psychologist and academic

Gian Vittorio Caprara (born 1 November 1944) is an Italian psychologist and academic whose research has focused on personality psychology, aggression, prosocial behavior, self-efficacy, and political behavior. He is a professor emeritus of personality psychology at Sapienza University of Rome.

== Background ==
Caprara studied political science at the Università Cattolica del Sacro Cuore in Milan and later specialized in psychology at the same university. He began his academic career in the early 1970s and in 1980 became full professor at Sapienza University of Rome, where he served as Chair of the Department of Psychology and Dean of the Faculty of Psychology.

He has been President of the European Association of Personality Psychology and is a member of the Academia Europaea.

== Recognitions and awards ==
- 1991 - Honorary member of the Italian Society of Behavioral and Cognitive Therapy
- 2003 - Winner of the Ig Nobel prize together with Claudio Barbaranelli and Philip Zimbardo
- 2018 - Honorary fellow of Scuola Superiore Studi Avanzati – Sapienza University of Rome
- 2021 - Academico de Honor, Academia de Psicología de España
- 2022 - Harrold Lasswell Award for Outstanding Scientific Accomplishment in Political Psychology
- 2023 - Doctor and Professor Honoris Causa at Eötvös Loránd University, Budapest
- 2023 - Doctor Honoris Causa at Universidad de Buenos Aires
