= Jean-Marc Vanden-Broeck =

UK mathematician of Belgian origin (born 1951)

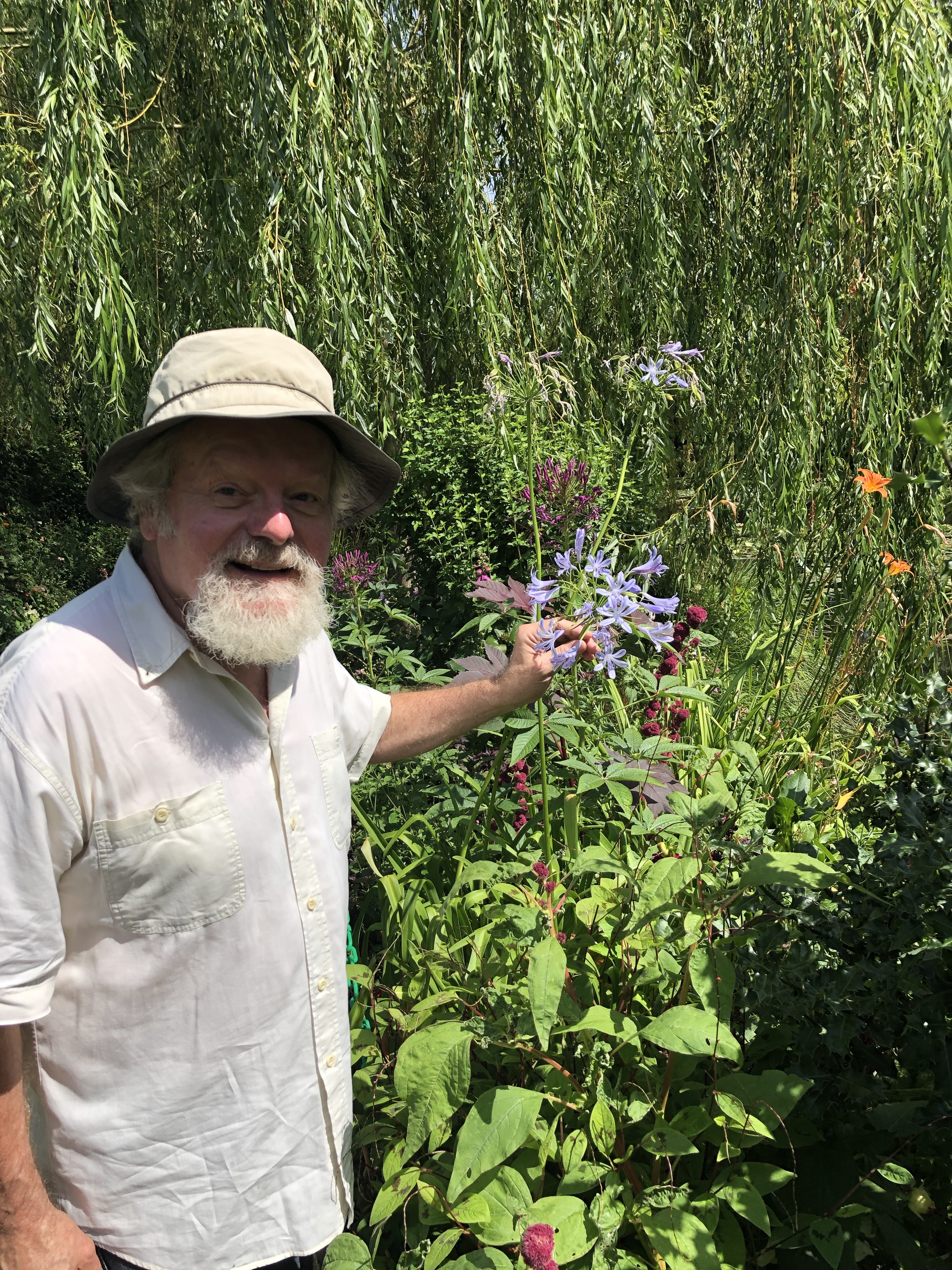
Vanden-Broeck in Giverny, 2019

Jean-Marc Vanden-Broeck (born 11 September 1951) is a UK mathematician of Belgian origin. He is a Professor of Applied Mathematics at the University College, London.

== Early life and education ==
Vanden-Broeck was born in Liège, Belgium on 11 September 1951. He received a degree in engineering and physics from the University Of Liège in 1974 and another one in oceanology in 1975. He then became a Ph.D. student at the University of Adelaide, Australia, where he worked with Ernie Tuck and Leonard Schwartz. His Ph.D. thesis entitled Two-dimensional nonlinear free surface flows past semi-infinite bodies, was defended in 1978 and received the William Culross Prize for Scientific Research.

== Academic career ==
After a short postdoctoral experience in Australia, Vanden-Broeck moved to the United States, first as a Senior Researcher at the Courant Institute, New York, 1978-1979, and then in a similar post at the Stanford University 1979-1981. There he started a fruitful collaboration with Joseph B Keller. He then moved to the University of Wisconsin-Madison, where he became a full professor in 1987. Vanden-Broeck stayed at the University of Wisconsin-Madison until 1998, when he returned to Europe, taking the post of the Professor of Applied Mathematics at the University of East Anglia in Norwich, England. In 2007 he moved to University College London, where he is a Professor of Applied Mathematics.

In addition to the posts listed above, Vanden-Broeck has held visiting professorship at a number of universities around the world, including a visiting professorship at the Tel Aviv University, Israel 1993-1994, Weisman Visiting Professorship at Baruch College in 2001 and Chair Montel at the University of Nice, France in 2019. Since 1999 he has been a Research Professor at New Jersey Institute of Technology. Vanden-Broeck has had many graduate students, some of whom are Ersin Ozugurlu, Ben Binder, Tao Gao and Alex Doak, and has mentored and co-mentored numerous postdocs, including Emilian Parau, Dmitri Tseluiko, Zhan Wang and Olga Tritchtchenko.

Vanden-Broeck shares his life between London and Paris. He is married to the logician Mirna Dzamonja. They have a daughter, Ada Vanden-Broeck, who was born in 2006.

== Scientific work ==
Vanden-Broeck works on Applied Mathematics, Fluid Mechanics and Scientific Computing. He is known for his work on free boundary problems. These problems involve solving partial differential equations in domains whose shape has to be found as part of the solution. They occur in applications, such as waves propagating at the interface between two fluids, bubbles rising in a fluid and growing tumours. Mathematically, free boundary problems are challenging because of their nonlinearity. He has developed efficient and accurate boundary integral equation methods to solve free boundary problems occurring in fluid mechanics.

An important insight of this work is the effect of surface tension, where he discovered classes of problems which have a continuum of solutions when surface tension is neglected but only a discrete set of solutions when surface tension is taken into account. Moreover, this discrete set reduces to a unique solution as the surface tension tends to zero. He is known for his work on fingering in Hele-Shaw cells. His more recent research is concerned with three-dimensional free surface flows and the discovery of three-dimensional solitary waves, as well as studying the effects of electric fields on interfacial flows.

Vanden-Broeck's publication list as of September 2019 has more than 230 papers and he is the author of the book Gravity-Capillary Free Surface Flows, Cambridge University Press, 2010. His work is frequently cited, with his h index equal to 42, according to the Google Scholar page, September 2019. Many of his papers are available at his personal web site at UCL.

== Awards ==
- Ig Nobel Prize in Physics, 1999

== Selected work ==
- Gravity-Capillary Free Surface Flows, book, Cambridge University Press, 2010
- Fingers in a Hele-Shaw Cell with Surface Tension, 1983
- Solitary and periodic gravity capillary waves of finite amplitude (with JK Hunter), 1983
- Solitary waves in water of infinite depth and related free surface flows (with F Dias), 1992
- Numerical calculations of the free-surface flow under a sluice gate, 1997
- Nonlinear three-dimensional gravity-capillary solitary waves (with MJ Cooker and EI Parau), 2005
- New hydroelastic solitary waves in deep water and their dynamics (with T Gao and Z Wang), 2016
- Non-wetting impact of a sphere onto a bath and its application to bouncing droplets (with CA Galeano-Rios and PA Milewski), 2017
- New exotic capillary free-surface flows (with A Doak), 2019

== See also ==
- List of Ig Nobel Prize winners
