= Shower-curtain effect =

Effect in physics

The shower-curtain effect in physics describes the phenomenon of a shower curtain being blown inward when a shower is running. The problem of identifying the cause of this effect has been featured in Scientific American magazine, with several hypotheses given to explain the phenomenon but no definite conclusion.

== Hypotheses ==
=== Buoyancy hypothesis ===
Also called the chimney effect or stack effect, this observes that warm air (from the hot shower) rises out over the shower curtain as cooler air (near the floor) pushes in under the curtain to replace the rising air. By pushing the curtain in towards the shower, the (short range) vortex and Coandă effects become more significant. However, the shower-curtain effect persists when cold water is used, implying that this is not the sole mechanism.

=== Bernoulli effect hypothesis ===
The most popular explanation given for the shower-curtain effect is Bernoulli's principle. Bernoulli's principle states that an increase in velocity results in a decrease in pressure. This theory presumes that the water flowing out of a shower head causes the air through which the water moves to start flowing in the same direction as the water. This movement would be parallel to the plane of the shower curtain. If air is moving across the inside surface of the shower curtain, Bernoulli's principle says the air pressure there will drop. This would result in a pressure differential between the inside and outside, causing the curtain to move inward. It would be strongest when the gap between the bather and the curtain is smallest, resulting in the curtain attaching to the bather.

=== Horizontal vortex hypothesis ===
A computer simulation of a typical bathroom found that none of the above theories pan out in their analysis, but instead found that the spray from the shower-head drives a horizontal vortex. This vortex has a low-pressure zone in the centre, which sucks the curtain.

David Schmidt of the University of Massachusetts was awarded the 2001 Ig Nobel Prize in Physics for his partial solution to the question of why shower curtains billow inwards. He used a computational fluid dynamics code to achieve the results. Professor Schmidt is adamant that this was done "for fun" in his own free time without the use of grants.

=== Coandă effect ===
The Coandă effect, also known as "boundary layer attachment", is the tendency of a moving fluid to adhere to an adjacent wall.
