= Clocky =

Alarm clock that uses wheels to hide itself

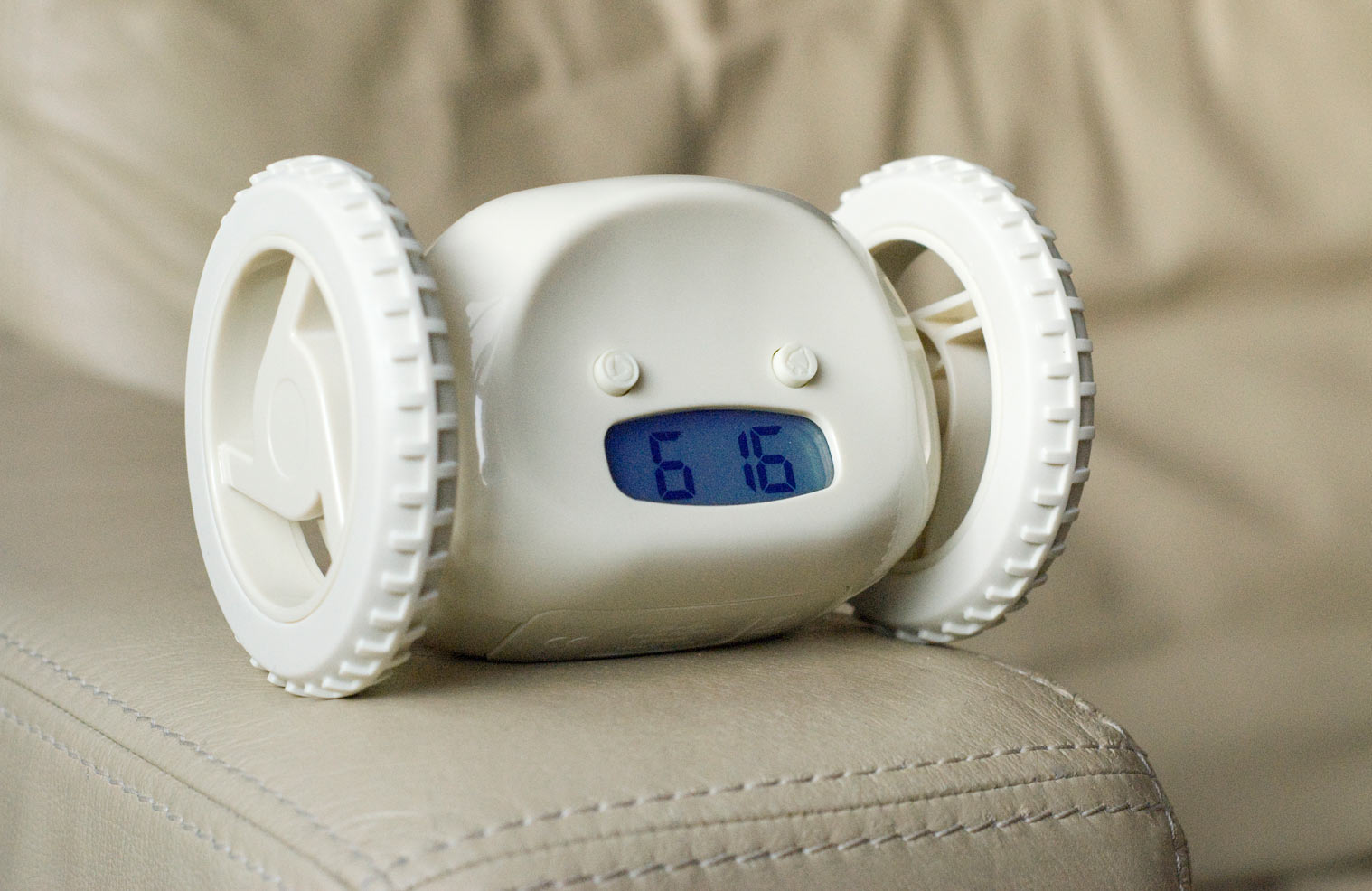
Clocky

Clocky is a brand of alarm clock outfitted with wheels, allowing it to hide itself in order to force the owner awake in an attempt to find it. Invented for an industrial design class by Gauri Nanda, then a graduate student at MIT Media Lab, Clocky won the 2005 Ig Nobel Prize in Economics. After earning her undergraduate degree from the University of Michigan and her master's degree from MIT, Nanda founded a company, Nanda Home, to commercialize Clocky and other home products.

== History ==
The original prototype, built in three days, was covered with shag carpet to appear like a pet. After the end of the design class for which she invented Clocky, Nanda did not make any further plans for the device. However, several months after a description was posted on the Media Lab website, pictures of Clocky were picked up on various technology product blogs including Gizmodo, Engadget, and BoingBoing. Within two weeks information about the device became an Internet meme and Nanda, the inventor, had been booked to demonstrate the device on Good Morning America.

MIT filed for a patent naming Nanda as the sole inventor and, with support from her family, left MIT after a master's degree to found Nanda Home and develop the invention for commercial production. The newer version, though not carpeted, is still designed to appear zoomorphic. Production is outsourced to Hong Kong. In October 2012 during a video interview, Gauri mentioned that over 500,000 units had already been sold.

The development of Clocky and marketing of it has become a Harvard Business School case study: Clocky, the Runaway Alarm Clock.

== Operation ==
The device functions as a regular alarm clock, except that it moves on its own power when the snooze button is pressed a second time. A microprocessor ensures that the device will move at a random speed, in a random direction, and around obstacles, using a different route each time. Large wheels on shock absorbers extend beyond the top of the clock to protect it from impact should it roll off a nightstand. By the time the alarm sounds again the device is in a place unknown to the user, who is forced to determine where it is, and possibly walk to that location to press the snooze button again.

== Tocky ==
Tocky is Nanda Home's second generation moving alarm clock, first advertised in 2010 as the "tech-savvy cousin" of Clocky. Similar to Clocky, it is a digital alarm clock with changeable skin that runs away on the alarm, but it is spherical (hence, it rolls on its own body rather than on wheels), has a touch screen display with a turnable round frame around it (to set the time and alarm), and receives up to over six hours of audio made by the recording the user's own voice or sounds directly to its microphone, or uploads through USB plugged from computers. Tocky also has a demo mode which enables it to move about and play installed sounds, not in the form of setting off an alarm. Nanda Home has a similar product, Ticky which has the same features as Tocky but with a digital analog-style face.
