= Francis McGlone =

Francis McGlone (2019)

Professor Francis Philip McGlone (born November 1948) is a neuroscientist. He was previously at Liverpool John Moores University, where he co-lead the Somatosensory & Affective Neuroscience Group.

== Awards and honours ==
In 2019, Professor McGlone & colleagues were awarded the Ig Nobel Peace Prize for their work on measuring The Pleasurability of Scratching an Itch.

== Selected publications ==
- Affective Touch and the Neurophysiology of CT Afferents (Joint editor)
- Itch: Basic Mechanisms and Therapy (Joint editor)
