= David Hu (scientist) =

American biologist

David Hu (2019 Ig Nobel Prize)

David L. Hu (born circa 1979) is an American mathematician, roboticist, and biologist who is currently an associate professor at the engineering department of Georgia Tech. His research centers on animal behavior and movement, and is noted for its eccentricity.

Hu was born in Rockville, Maryland, and as high school student he was a semifinalist in the Westinghouse Science Talent Search. His father was a chemist who enjoyed collecting and dissecting road kill, which inspired his son's curiosity regarding the science of living things. He received his Bachelor's degree and Ph.D. from the Massachusetts Institute of Technology.

Hu is married to Dr. Jia Fan, a data scientist employed by AT&T with whom he has two children. Hu's children have inspired some of his research projects. "From a diaper change with my son, I was inspired to study urination. From watching my daughter being born, I was inspired by her long eyelashes."

Hu is known for focusing on irreverent and whimsical research subjects. In 2016 his work was criticized by Arizona Senator Jeff Flake as one of the twenty most wasteful federally funded research projects. Hu responded to this criticism with a TEDx talk in which he embraced the label of "the country's most wasteful scientist" and criticized the senator's understanding of the scientific method.

== Recognition ==
Hu has twice won the Ig Nobel Prize for Physics. In 2015 he shared the prize with Patricia Yang for research on the duration of animal urination, in which Yang and Hu found that nearly all mammals evacuate their bladders in approximately 21 seconds plus or minus 13 seconds. In 2019 Hu and colleagues won the prize for studying the means of production of the cubical feces of wombats.

He was named a Fellow of the American Physical Society in 2023, "for innovative experiments in biological fluid mechanics and a willingness to share them with young scientists".
