= Administratium =

Scientific in-joke

Administratium is a well-known in-joke in scientific circles and is a parody both on the bureaucracy of the scientific community and academic institutions, and on descriptions of newly discovered chemical elements.

In 1991, Thomas Kyle (the supposed discoverer of this element) was awarded an Ig Nobel Prize for physics, making him one of only three fictional people to have won the award.

A spoof article was written by William DeBuvitz in 1988 and first appeared in print in the January 1989 issue of The Physics Teacher. It spread rapidly among university campuses and research centers; many versions surfaced, often customized to the contributor's situation.

A similar joke concerns Administrontium which was referenced in print in 1993.

Another variation on the same joke is Bureaucratium. A commonly heard description describes it as "having a negative half-life". In other words, the more time passes, the more massive "Bureaucratium" becomes; it only grows larger and more sluggish. This refers to the bureaucratic system, which is generally perceived as a system in which bureaucratic procedures accumulate, and whatever needs to get done takes increasingly longer to get done as soon as it touches the bureaucracy.

== See also ==
- Unobtainium
- Wishalloy
- List of fictional elements, materials, isotopes and subatomic particles
