= Nesmeyanov Institute of Organoelement Compounds =

Soviet-Russian research institute

The A.N. Nesmeyanov Institute of Organoelement Compounds of Russian Academy of Sciences (INEOS RAS) (Russian: Институт элементоорганических соединений Российской Академии Наук им. А.Н. Несмеянова (ИНЭОС РАН)) is a research centre founded in 1954 by the president of the USSR Academy of Sciences, Alexander Nesmeyanov. After his exit, the institute was run by A.V. Fokin from 1980 to 1988, M.E. Vol’pin (1989–1996), Yu.N.Bubnov (1996–2013), A.M. Muzafarov (2013–2018), and A.A. Trifonov (2018)

In 2019 and 2020, scientific journal "Journal of Organometallic Chemistry" decided to publish two special issues on the occasion of the 120th anniversary of the famous Russian organometallic chemist Alexander N. Nesmeyanov and the occasion of the 70th birthday of professor Elena Shubina, to note the scientific contribution of scientists in organometallics and the field of non-covalent interactions (Shubina).
