= Ig Nobel Prize =

Annually awarded parody of the Nobel Prize

- "The Stinker", mascot of the Ig Nobel Prize
- Awarded for: Research that "first makes people laugh, then makes them think"
- Country: United States (1991–2019, 2024–2025); Online (2020–2023); Switzerland (2026–present)
- Presented by: Annals of Improbable Research
- Reward: A 10 trillion Zimbabwean dollar banknote (US$0.04)
- First award: 3 October 1991; 35 years ago
- Website: improbable.com

The Ig Nobel Prize (/ˌɪɡ noʊˈbɛl/), also known as the Ig Nobels or simply the Ig's, is a satirical prize awarded annually since 1991 to promote public engagement with scientific research. Its aim is to "honor achievements that first make people laugh, and then make them think". The award parodies the Nobel Prize and is named after Ignatius Nobel, a fictional cousin of the Nobel Prize's founder, Alfred Nobel. The name is also a pun on the word ignoble. Most awards are for genuine scientific achievements with an unorthodox, obvious or humorous slant, while other awards are given ironically to various politicians, media figures, or promoters of pseudoscience.

Organized by the scientific humor magazine Annals of Improbable Research, the Ig Nobel Prizes are awarded in 10 categories each year, presented by Nobel laureates in a ceremony that was held at the Massachusetts Institute of Technology or Harvard University until 2026, when the ceremony was moved to Zurich, Switzerland, due to safety concerns about international visitors entering the United States. The winners deliver 60-second acceptance speeches, and receive a low-quality home-made prize.

The ceremony contains a number of whimsical events and running jokes, including throwing paper planes onto the stage, competing to win a date with a Nobel laureate, and the "24/7" lectures where winners summarize their research in 24 seconds, then in seven words.

== History ==
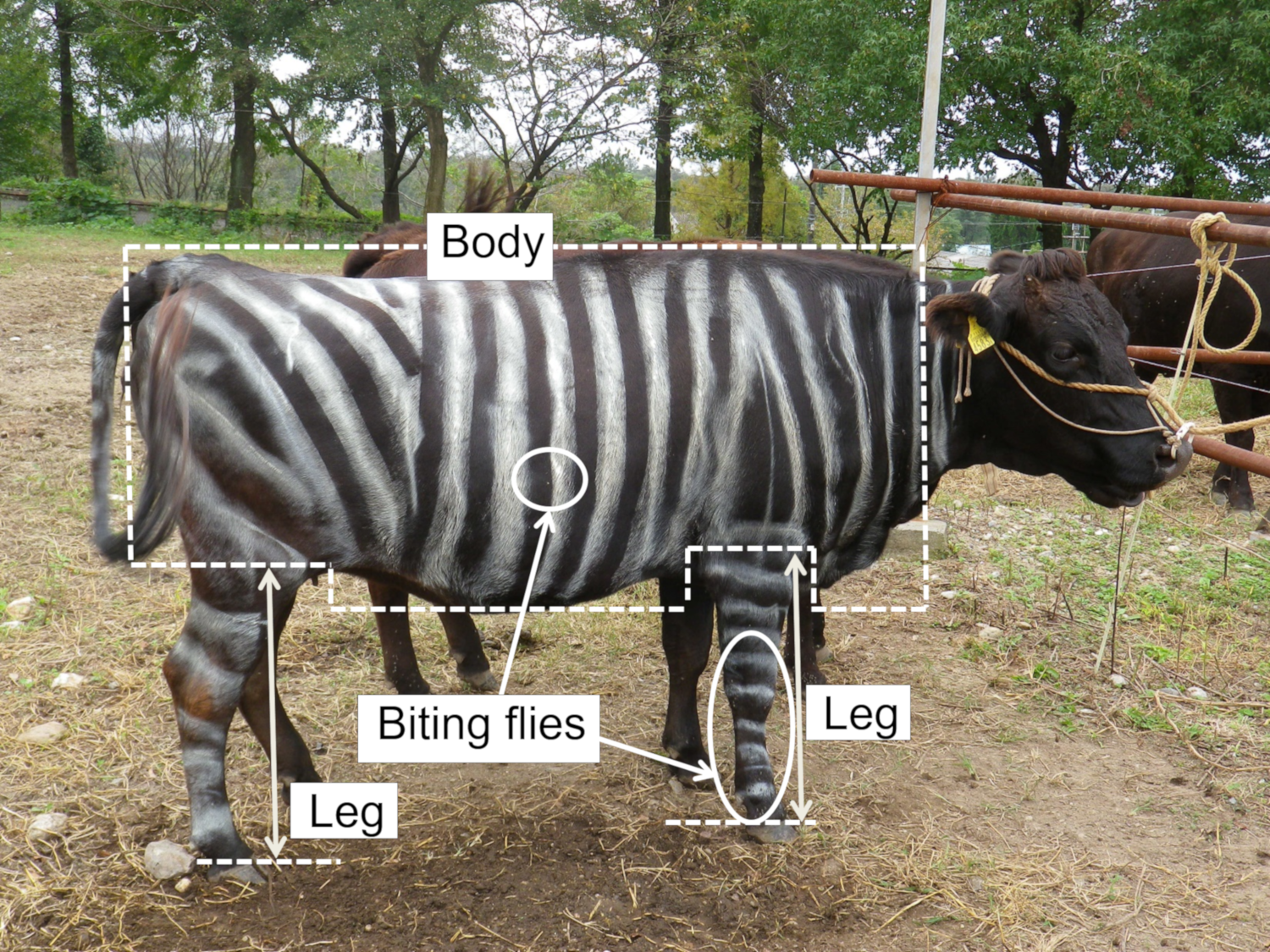
The 2025 Ig Nobel Prize in biology was awarded to Tomoki Kojima and other researchers for demonstrating that painting cows with black and white stripes can prevent biting flies biting them without using more pesticide.

The Ig Nobels were created in 1991 by Marc Abrahams, then editor-in-chief of the Journal of Irreproducible Results and later co-founder of the Annals of Improbable Research (AIR), who has been the master of ceremonies at all awards. The prize is named after the fictional Ignatius Nobel, inventor of the soda pop and distant cousin of Alfred Nobel, who founded the Nobel Prize, which the Ig Nobels parody. The name is also a pun on the word ignoble. Awards were presented for discoveries "that cannot or should not be reproduced".

The ceremony originally took place in a lecture hall at the Massachusetts Institute of Technology (MIT) but moved in 1995 to the Sanders Theater at Harvard University. Due to the COVID-19 pandemic, the event was held fully online from 2020 to 2023, returning to MIT in September 2024. The 36th ceremony took place on September 3rd in the Congress Center of Zurich, Switzerland, and was hosted by the University of Zurich and ETH Domain, with Abrahams saying that the United States had become "unsafe" for guests. As part of the ceremony it was announced that the next Ig ceremony will take place in Antwerp, Belgium on September 5, 2027.

Sir Andre Geim, who had been awarded an Ig Nobel Prize in 2000 for levitating a frog by magnetism, was awarded a Nobel Prize in physics in 2010 for his work with the electromagnetic properties of graphene. He is the only individual, as of 2026, to have received both a Nobel and an Ig Nobel. (Note: In January 2026, María Corina Machado, the recipient of the 2025 Nobel Peace Prize, gave her Nobel medal to Donald Trump, a co-recipient of the 2020 Ig Nobel Prize in Medical Education, but The Nobel Prize Committee clarified that the prize "cannot be revoked, shared or transferred".)

== Awards ==
The aim of the awards, according to Abrahams, is to promote public engagement with science, attempting to appeal to people who "think it's scary, or impossible to understand, or just plain boring". Ten prizes are awarded in categories which vary each year, to research which "first make people laugh, and then make them think". Categories often include the Nobel Prize categories of physics, chemistry, medicine, literature, economics, and peace, but occasionally other fields such as engineering, mathematics, neuroscience, or veterinary medicine. Awards can be given posthumously.

The Ig Nobel Prizes recognize genuine achievements, with the exception of three prizes awarded in the first year to fictitious scientists Josiah S. Carberry, Paul DeFanti, and Thomas Kyle (for his discovery of Administratium). Some awards are given ironically as criticism of research, such as in 2020 when the medical education prize was awarded to various world leaders after they had been criticized for understating the effects of the COVID-19 pandemic. Other prizes have been awarded to researchers of pseudoscience, such as homeopathy.

The winners are chosen by the Ig Nobel board of governors, who receive over 9,000 nominations each year, roughly 10–20% of which are self-nominations. Winners are contacted before being announced to allow them to decline the award, though few do.

== Ceremony ==
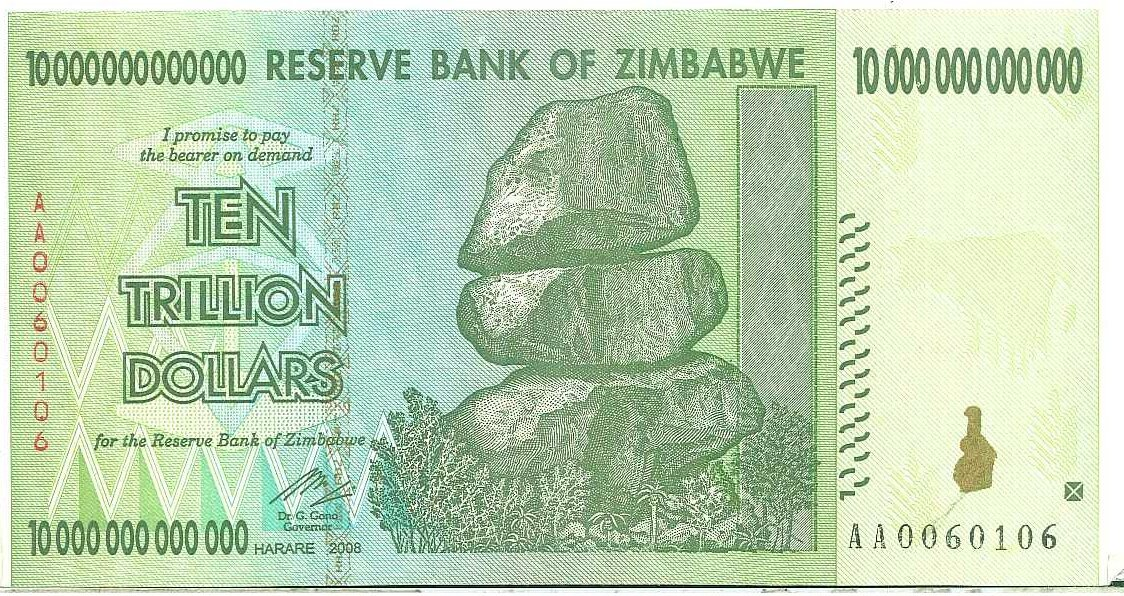
Winners are awarded a 10 trillion Zimbabwean dollar banknote.

The ceremony takes place annually in September, a few weeks before the announcement of the year's Nobel Prize winners. The ceremony opens with the "welcome, welcome" speech, which consists of two words: "welcome, welcome".

Winners give a 60-second acceptance speech. Traditionally, an eight-year-old girl, nicknamed Miss Sweetie Poo, stood nearby and would repeatedly say "Please stop. I'm bored" if speakers go on too long. In 2026, the eight-year old girl was replaced by three people in banana suits who would signal if the speakers go over their time limit. The ceremony also includes "24/7" speeches, where winners first summarize their work in 24 seconds, then in seven words. The prizes are presented by Nobel laureates, with the winners receiving a prize "made of cheap materials that are prone to disintegrate", and a solitary banknote for the amount of 10 trillion Zimbabwean dollars (US$0.04, but the banknote is worth more as a collector's item). In 2025, instead of the banknote, winners were presented with a single packaged moist towelette.

Throwing paper planes onto the stage is a long-standing tradition. Until his death in 2018, Professor Roy J. Glauber swept the stage clean of airplanes as the official "Keeper of the Broom". Glauber could not attend the 2005 awards because he was traveling to Stockholm to claim a genuine Nobel Prize in Physics. Each ceremony also contains a contest where audience members can win a date with a Nobel laureate, as well as a unique event for the year. At the 1997 ceremonies, a team from the Institute for Cryogenic Sex Research distributed a pamphlet titled "Safe Sex at Four Kelvin"; the ceremony in 2000 included a debate to determine the most intelligent person, where two contestants spoke at the same time for 30 seconds.

The ceremony is co-sponsored by the Harvard Computer Society, the Harvard–Radcliffe Science Fiction Association, and the Harvard–Radcliffe Society of Physics Students. It traditionally closes with the words: "If you didn't win a prize—and especially if you did—better luck next year!"

== Reception and legacy ==
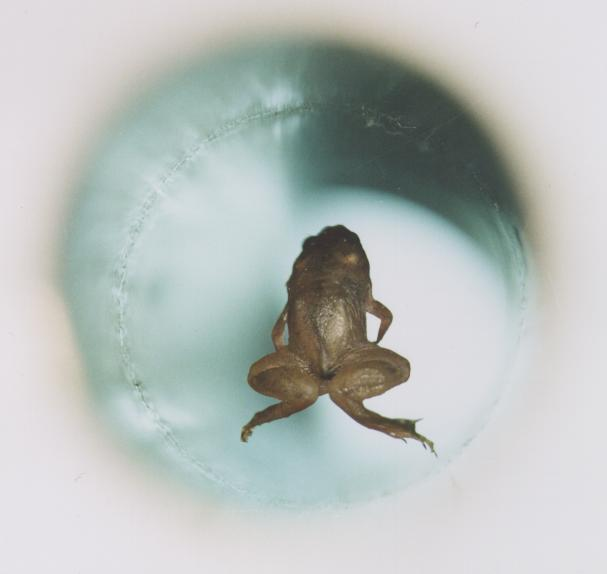
The 2000 Ig Nobel Prize in physics was awarded to Andre Geim and Michael Berry for the magnetic levitation of a live frog. Geim was awarded an actual Nobel Prize in Physics in 2010.

The Ig Nobel Prize has received some criticism from scientists. Robert May, who at the time was the chief scientific adviser for the UK, requested that British scientists be excluded from the prize, worried that it would harm their career prospects. As the prize has become more well-known, the scientific community have been more appreciative of it, with some research getting more attention due to winning. At the 2025 ceremony, Tomoki Kojima, one of the winners of the year's biology prize, said that the award "serves as motivation for us to continue striving for excellence".

A September 2009 article in The National of Abu Dhabi titled "A noble side to Ig Nobels" said that, although the prize is often awarded to research of "trivial" questions, history shows that trivial research sometimes leads to important breakthroughs. In 2006, a study showing that mosquitoes that can carry malaria are attracted equally to the smell of Limburger cheese and the smell of human feet earned the Ig Nobel Prize in biology. As a result of these findings, traps baited with this cheese have been used to combat the malaria epidemic in Africa. Before receiving the 2010 Nobel Prize in Physics for his research on graphene, Andre Geim shared the physics Ig Nobel in 2000 with Michael Berry for the magnetic levitation of a frog, which by 2022 was reportedly part of the inspiration for China's lunar gravity research facility.

== See also ==
- List of Ig Nobel Prize winners
- Golden Raspberry Awards – awards for bad movies
- Bulwer-Lytton Fiction Contest – an award for bad writing
- Bookseller/Diagram Prize for Oddest Title of the Year – an award for books with unusual titles
- Pigasus Award – exposing parapsychological, paranormal, or psychic frauds
- Golden Fleece Award – award for waste of government funds; often awarded for government-paid research considered frivolous or wasteful
- Foot in Mouth Award – an award presented by the Plain English Campaign for "a baffling comment by a public figure"
