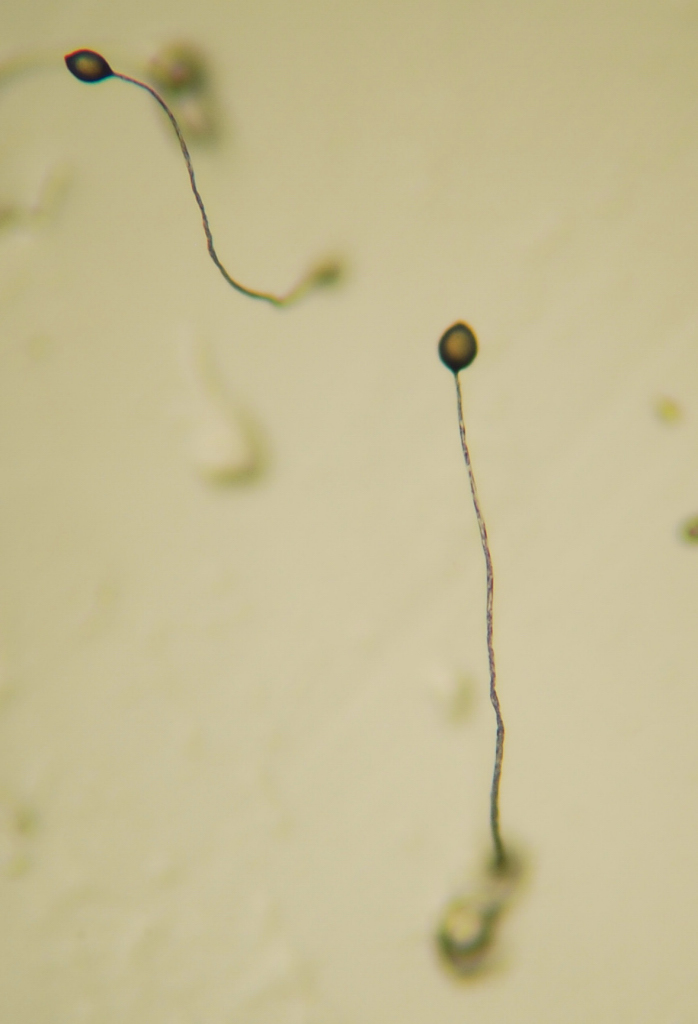
- Dictyostelium fruiting bodies

Scientific classification
- Domain: Eukaryota
- Supergroup: Amorphea
- Phylum: Amoebozoa
- Class: Dictyostelia
- Order: Dictyosteliida
- Family: Dictyosteliidae
- Genus: Dictyostelium; Bref.

Type species
- Dictyostelium mucoroides Brefeld 1869

Synonyms
- Heterosphondylium Traub 1977 nom. nud. non Nägeli 1862; Hyalostilbum Oudemans 1885

= Dictyostelium =

Genus of slime molds

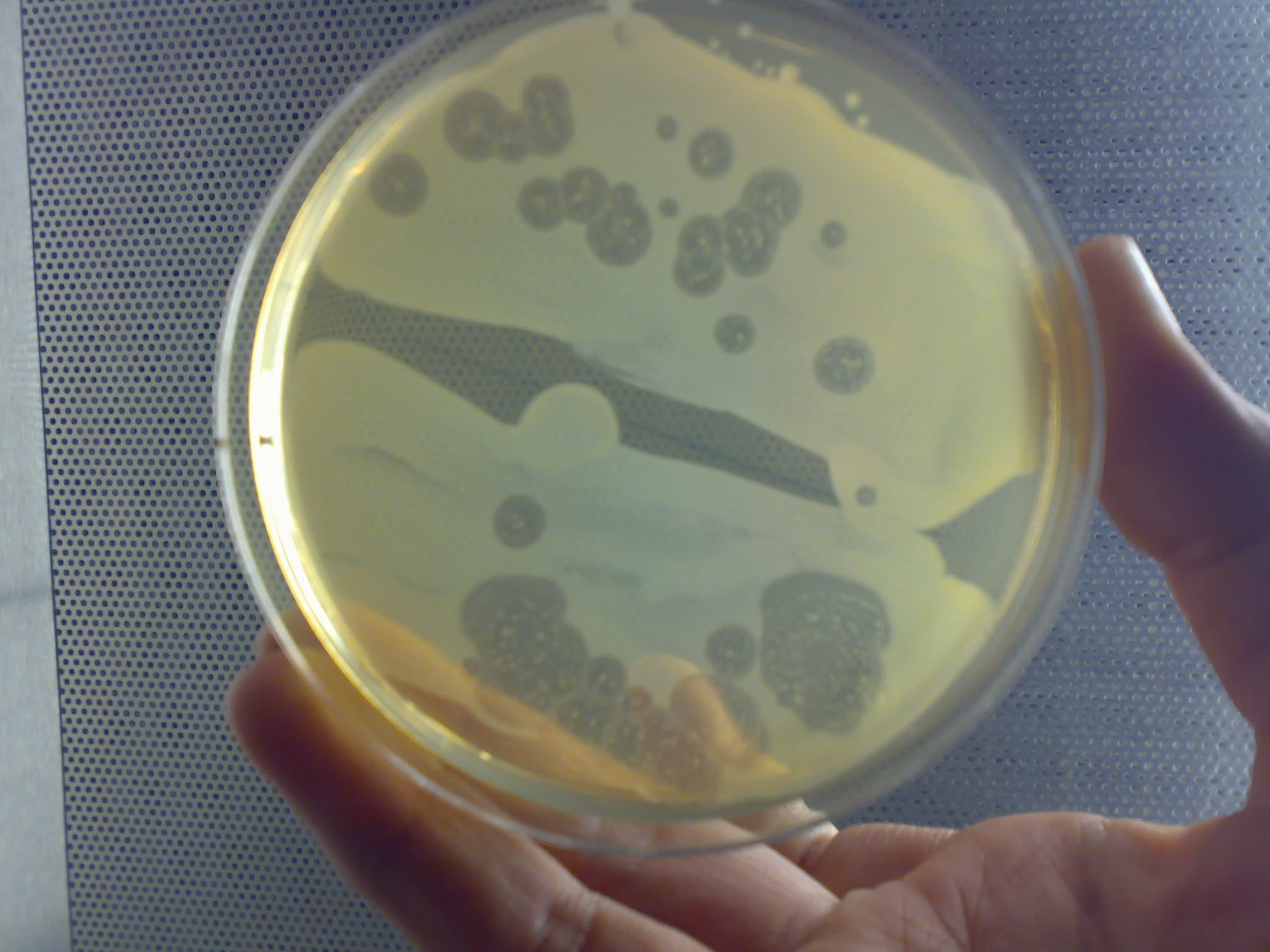
Dictyostelium aggregations on a culture plate

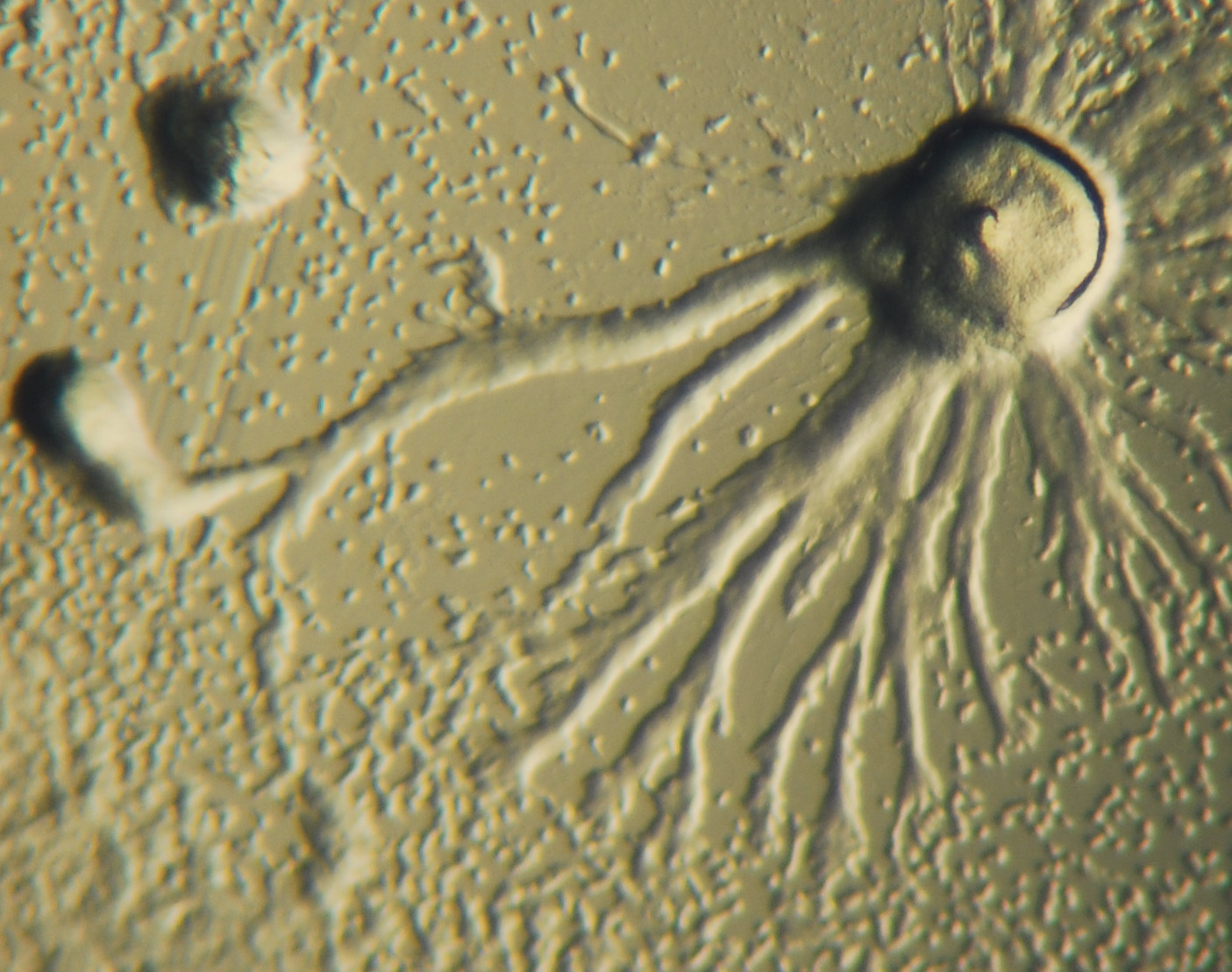
Dictyostelium colony in process of aggregation

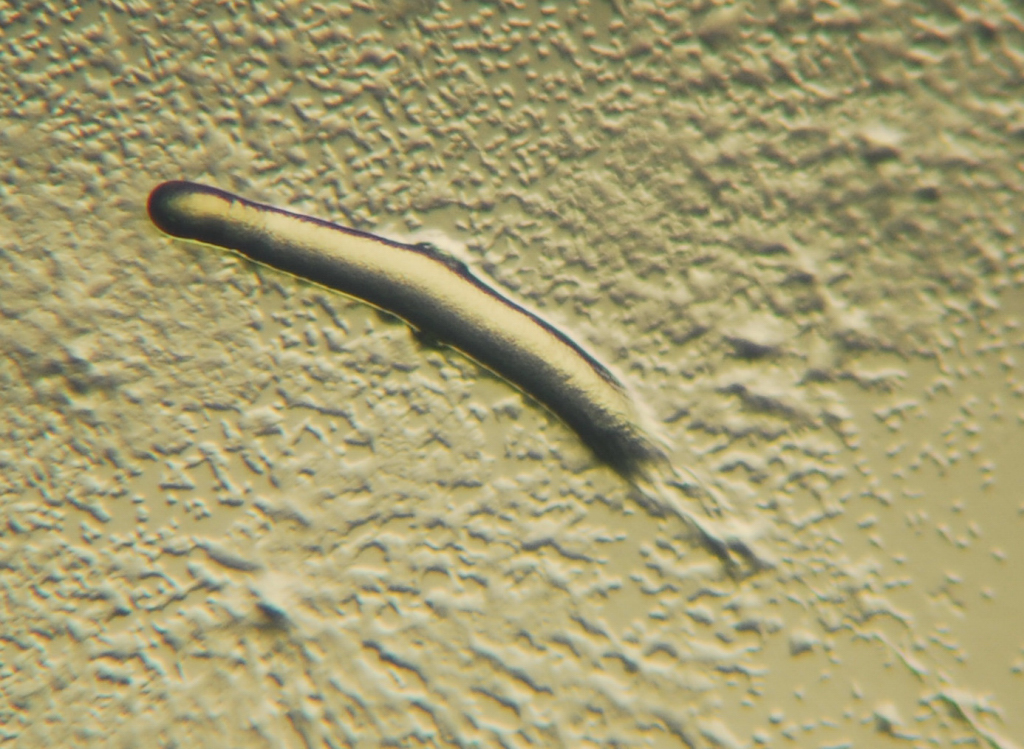
Pseudoplasmodium or "slug" of a Dictyostelium

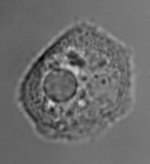
Single amoeboid cell of Dictyostelium, showing the contractile vacuole

Dictyostelium is a genus of single- and multi-celled eukaryotic, phagotrophic bacterivores. Though they are protista and in no way fungal, they traditionally are known as "slime molds". They are present in most terrestrial ecosystems as a normal and often abundant component of the soil microflora, and play an important role in the maintenance of balanced bacterial populations in soils.

The genus Dictyostelium is in the order Dictyosteliida, the so-called cellular slime molds or social amoebae. In turn the order is in the infraphylum Mycetozoa. Members of the order are of great theoretical interest in biology because they have aspects of both unicellularity and multicellularity. The individual cells in their independent phase are common on organic detritus or in damp soils and caves. In this phase they are amoebae. Typically, the amoebal cells grow separately and wander independently, feeding mainly on bacteria. However, they interact to form multi-cellular structures following starvation. Groups of up to about 100,000 cells signal each other by releasing chemoattractants such as cyclic AMP (cAMP) or glorin. They then coalesce by chemotaxis to form an aggregate that becomes surrounded by an extracellular matrix. The aggregate forms a fruiting body, with cells differentiating individually into different components of the final structure. In some species, the whole aggregate may move collectively – forming a structure known as a grex or "slug" – before finally forming a fruiting body. Basic processes of development such as differential cell sorting, pattern formation, stimulus-induced gene expression, and cell-type regulation are common to Dictyostelium and metazoans. For further detail see family Dictyostelid.

== Discovery ==
The cellular slime mold was formerly considered to be fungi following their discovery in 1869 by Brefeld. Although they resemble fungi in some respects, they have been included in the kingdom Protista. Individual cells resemble small amoebae in their movement and feeding, and so are referred to as myxamoebae. D. discoideum is the most studied of the genus.

== Traits ==
Most of its life, this haploid social amoeba undergoes a vegetative cycle, preying upon bacteria in the soil, and periodically dividing mitotically. When food is scarce, either the sexual cycle or the social cycle begins. Under the social cycle, amoebae aggregate in response to cAMP by the thousands, and form a motile slug, which moves towards light. Ultimately the slug forms a fruiting body in which about 20% of the cells die to lift the remaining cells up to a better place for sporulation and dispersal.

When starved for their bacterial food supply and exposed to dark, moist conditions, heterothallic or homothallic strains can undergo sexual development that results in the formation of a diploid zygote. Heterothallic mating has been best studied in D. discoideum and homothallic mating has been best studied in Dictyostelium mucoroides (strain DM7). In the heterothallic sexual cycle, amoebae aggregate in response to cAMP and sex pheromones, and two cells of opposite mating types fuse, and then begin consuming the other attracted cells. Before they are consumed, some of the prey cells form a cellulose wall around the entire group. When cannibalism is complete, the giant diploid cell is a hardy macrocyst which eventually undergoes recombination and meiosis, and hatches hundreds of recombinants. In D. mucoroides (DM7) homothallic mating, cells are directed towards sexual development by ethylene. Scientists also found the collective cell migration could occur without the presence of cAMP oscillations at multicellular stages, and novel models have been proposed to interpret this interesting phenomenon.

== Social characteristics ==
Professor John Tyler Bonner (1920–2019) spent a lifetime researching the slime molds and created a number of films in the 1940s to show the life cycle; he mostly studied D. discoideum. In the videos, intelligence appears to be observed as the single cells, after separation, regroup into a cellular mass. The time-lapse film captivated audiences; indeed, Bonner when giving conferences stated that the film "always stole the show". The video is available on YouTube.

When the organisms congregate, the mass is made of genetically distinct cells. Through natural selection, it is determined which of the organisms' genetic information will be present in future generations. The conflict is evidenced by unequal representations of two genetically different clones in spores of a chimera, the reduction of functionality seen in migrating chimeras, and a differentiation inducing factor (DIF) system, akin to poison, that appears to be made of cells forcing others to cease output of genetic information.

== Species ==
Taxonomy of Dictyostelium is complicated. It has also been confused by the different forms in the life cycle stages and by the similar Polysphondylium spp. Below are some reported examples.

- ?Dictyostelium annularibasimum Li, Liu & Zhao 2016
- ?Dictyostelium arabicum Hagiwara 1991
- ?Dictyostelium barbarae Stephenson et al. 2019
- ?Dictyostelium culliculosum Li & He 2008
- ?Dictyostelium dichotomum Vadell & Cavender 2007
- ?Dictyostelium germanicum Cavender et al. 1995
- ?Dictyostelium globisporum Li & Liu 2011
- ?Dictyostelium insulinativitatis Stephenson et al. 2019
- ?Dictyostelium irregularis Olive et al. 1967
- ?Dictyostelium magnum Hagiw. 1983
- ?Dictyostelium microsorocarpum Li & He 2010
- ?Dictyostelium roseum van Tieghem 1880
- ?Dictyostelium vermiformum Vadell & Cavender 2007
- Dictyostelium ammophilum Romeralo et al. 2010 ex Baldauf, Sheikh & Thulin 2017
- Dictyostelium aureocephalum Hagiwara 1991
- Dictyostelium aureum Olive 1901
- Dictyostelium austroandinum Vadell et al. 2011
- Dictyostelium barbibulus Perrigo & Romeralo 2013
- Dictyostelium brefeldianum Hagiw. 1984
- Dictyostelium brevicaule Olive 1901
- Dictyostelium brunneum Kawabe 1982
- Dictyostelium capitatum Hagiwara 1983
- Dictyostelium chordatum Vadell et al. 2011
- Dictyostelium citrinum Vadell et al. 1995
- Dictyostelium clavatum Hagiwara 1992
- Dictyostelium crassicaule Hagiwara 1984
- Dictyostelium dimigraformum Cavender 1970
- Dictyostelium discoideum Raper 1935
- Dictyostelium firmibasis Hagiwara 1971
- Dictyostelium gargantuum Vadell et al. 2011
- Dictyostelium giganteum Singh 1947
- Dictyostelium implicatum Hagiwara 1984
- Dictyostelium intermedium Cavender 1976
- Dictyostelium leptosomopsis Vadell et al. 2011
- Dictyostelium leptosomum Cavender et al. 2002
- Dictyostelium longosporum Hagiwara 1983
- Dictyostelium macrocephalum Hagiwara 1985
- Dictyostelium medium Hagiwara 1992
- Dictyostelium mucoroides Brefeld 1869
- Dictyostelium pseudobrefeldianum Hagiwara 1996
- Dictyostelium purpureum Olive 1901
- Dictyostelium quercibrachium Cavender et al. 2002
- Dictyostelium robustum Hagiwara 1996
- Dictyostelium rosarium Raper & Cavender 1968
- Dictyostelium septentrionale Cavender 1978
- Dictyostelium sphaerocephalum (Oudem. 1885) Saccardo, Marchal & Marchal 1885
- Dictyostelium valdivianum Vadell et al. 2011
