= Sorodiplophrys stercorea =

Scientific classification
- Domain: Eukaryota
- Clade: Diaphoretickes
- Clade: Sar
- Clade: Stramenopiles
- Phylum: Bigyra
- Class: Labyrinthulomycetes
- Order: Amphifilida
- Family: Sorodiplophryidae
- Genus: Sorodiplophrys
- Species: S. stercorea

Binomial name
- Sorodiplophrys stercorea (Cienk.) L.S. Olive & Dykstra

Species of sorocarpic protist

Sorodiplophrys stercorea is a sorocarpic protist known for its unique multicellular fruiting structures called sorocarps. It exhibits a form of aggregative multicellularity and utilizes filose pseudopodia for locomotion and absorptive nutrition. This unicellular organism was initially described as Diplophrys stercorea by Cienkowsky in 1876 due to similarities in pseudopodia and the presence of golden pigment globules. However, it was later reclassified as Sorodiplophrys stercorea by Dykstra and Olive in 1975, based on its aggregative behavior and terrestrial habitat. Molecular studies have placed it in the Amphifiloidea clade of Stramenopiles, showcasing an independent evolutionary pathway for sorocarpic multicellularity.

== Ecology ==
Sorodiplophrys stercorea inhabits nutrient-rich, moist terrestrial environments, particularly in the dung of cows (Bos taurus) and horses (Equus caballus). When placed in moist chambers under laboratory conditions, sorocarps can form within 2 to 13 days. The organism relies on osmotrophic feeding, absorbing nutrients from its substrate, and does not exhibit phagotrophy.

== Morphology ==
Sorodiplophrys stercorea is characterized by nearly orbicular or elliptic cells in shape. Its sorocytes measure 2.4–4.8 μm in width and 4.8–9.6 μm in length and contain a single nucleus along with a prominent yellow lipid globule. Additional features include refractive granules, a contractile vacuole, and ectoplasmic elements. During the vegetative phase, cells enlarge to approximately 9.6 × 16.8 μm, supported by thin, scale-like layers. The long, filose pseudopodia, which branch or anastomose, aid in movement and aggregation.

== Behavior ==
Sorodiplophrys stercorea displays aggregative multicellularity, forming fruiting bodies (sorocarps) through chemotactic aggregation. The pseudopodia enable gliding motion and occasionally back-and-forth movement. During aggregation, the pseudopodia of multiple cells anastomose, allowing coordinated motion. Laboratory observations suggest that sorocarps serve as a survival mechanism, compensating for the absence of cyst formation under adverse conditions.

== Taxonomic history ==
Sorodiplophrys stercorea was first described as Diplophrys stercorea by Cienkowsky in 1876, based on similarities to the genus Labyrinthula. However, its ability to form sorocarps and its terrestrial habitat prompted Dykstra and Olive to establish the new genus Sorodiplophrys in 1975. Phylogenetic analyses based on SSU rRNA sequences have since placed S. stercorea within the Amphifiloidea clade of the class Labyrinthulea, distinguishing it from the paraphyletic genus Diplophrys.

== Phylogenetics and evolution ==
Molecular studies confirm that Sorodiplophrys stercorea belongs to the Amphifiloidea clade of Stramenopiles, with close relatives in the genus Amphifila. Shared traits include spindle-shaped cells and anastomosing pseudopodia. The evolution of sorocarpic multicellularity in S. stercorea is an example of convergent evolution, with similar adaptations independently arising in multiple eukaryotic lineages, including Amoebozoa, Nuclearidae, Alveolata, Excavata, and Rhizaria

== Significance ==
The discovery of Sorodiplophrys stercorea highlights the diversity of multicellular strategies among protists. Sorocarpic multicellularity has evolved independently in at least seven eukaryotic lineages. This convergence suggests adaptive advantages for multicellularity in nutrient acquisition and spore dispersal. Studying the molecular mechanisms in S. stercorea may provide insights into the genetic and ecological factors driving multicellularity across life forms.
