= Lindbladia =

Lindbladia may refer to:

- 1448 Lindbladia – a main-belt asteroid
- Linbladia – monotypic genus of Lindbladia tubulina
