= Sporocarp =

Sporocarp may refer to:

- Sporocarp (fungus), a multicellular structure on which spore-producing structures are borne
- Sporocarp (ferns), specialized spore-producing structure found in some ferns

== See also ==
- Sorocarp, the fruiting body of certain cellular slime moulds
