= World Cell Race =

The World Cell Race is a competition among labs to see which biological cell type can travel 600 microns the fastest. The idea is to promote research into how to make cells move faster to aid immune system response or slow metastatic cancers. A fork with a dead end was added to the course in 2013 to assess responses to growth-factor protein. The race was broadcast live online. A Dicty World Race "to find the fastest and smartest Dicty cells" took place on May 16, 2014, in Boston.
