= Dictyostelium class I RNA =

Class I RNA
- Predicted secondary structure of the class I RNA

Identifiers
- Rfam: RF01414

Other data
- RNA type: Gene
- Domain: Eukaryota
- PDB structures: PDBe

The class I RNA is a non-coding RNA. This family was identified in Shotgun sequencing approach of full-length cDNA libraries from small RNAs from Dictyostelium discoideum. The function of this RNA is unknown, but it bears some resemblance to riboswitches found primarily in bacteria. These RNAs are 42–65 nucleotides (nt) long and they share 5' and 3' sequence elements of 16 and 8 nt respectively. These elements can partially base-pair forming a short hairpin.

There are multiple copies of class I RNA in the D. discoideum genome and the RNA is highly expressed i.e. 14 unique sequences were identified in the small RNA library and it comprised ~12% of all RNA in the small RNA library. Homologs to class I RNA have only been located in D. discoideum to date. Some of the members of this family were also identified in a bioinformatic screen. This family has also been the subject of reviews.

== See also ==
- Non-coding RNA
- Dictyostelium class II RNA
