= Dictyostelium class II RNA =

Class II RNA
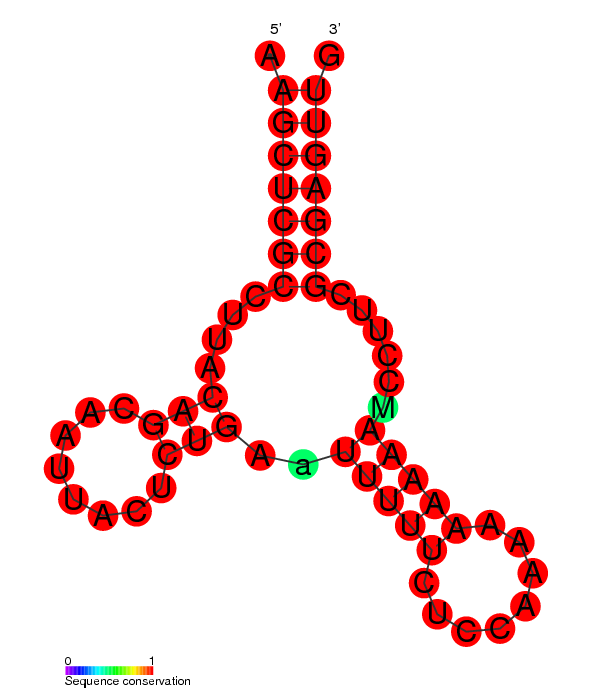
- Class II RNA conserved secondary structure

Identifiers

Other data
- RNA type: Cis-reg
- Domain: Dictyostelium discoideum
- PDB structures: PDBe

The class II RNA is a non-coding RNA. This family was identified using shotgun sequencing of full-length cDNA libraries of small RNAs (sRNA) from the social amoeba Dictyostelium discoideum. The RNAs are 59–60 nucleotides in length. A Northern blot analysis showed that this ncRNA was expressed in all stages of development and that, like Dictyostelium class I RNA, class II is strongly localised in the cytoplasm. Dictyostelium class I and II share a consensus sequence (5'-CCUUACAGCAA-3') which is found in an 'open' area of the secondary structure of both molecules. The function of this RNA is unknown.

== See also ==
- Dictyostelium class I RNA
- non-coding RNA
