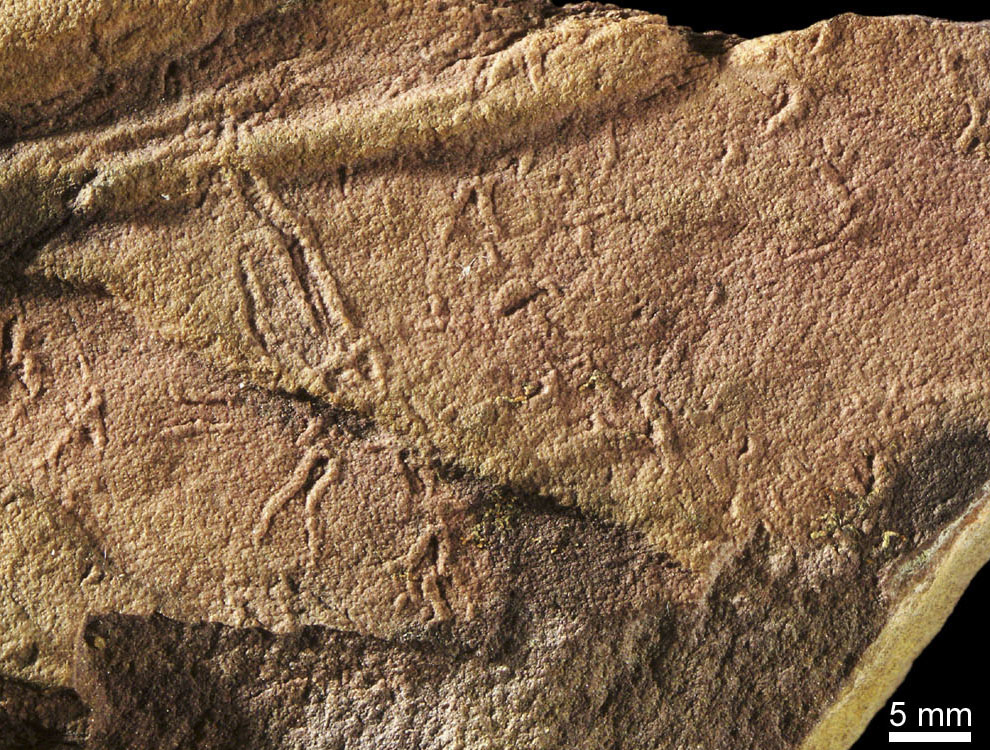
- Myxomitodes stirlingensis holotype from 1900 million year old Stirling Range Formation, Western Australia

Scientific classification
- Domain: Eukaryota
- (unranked): ?Amoebozoa
- Infraphylum: ?Mycetozoa
- Class: ?Dictyostelia
- Family: ?Dictyostelidae
- Genus: Myxomitodes Bengston et al. 2007

Type species
- Myxomitodes stirlingensis Bengtson et al. 2007

= Myxomitodes =

Myxomitodes Temporal range: 1900 Ma

Type of trace fossil

Myxomitodes (Greek "slime thread like") is a genus of problematic fossil from the Paleoproterozoic (1900 million years old) Stirling Range Formation of Western Australia, and is significant as a very old megascopic fossil, and thus eukaryote. It is a trace fossil and thus evidence of activity, rather than a body fossil.

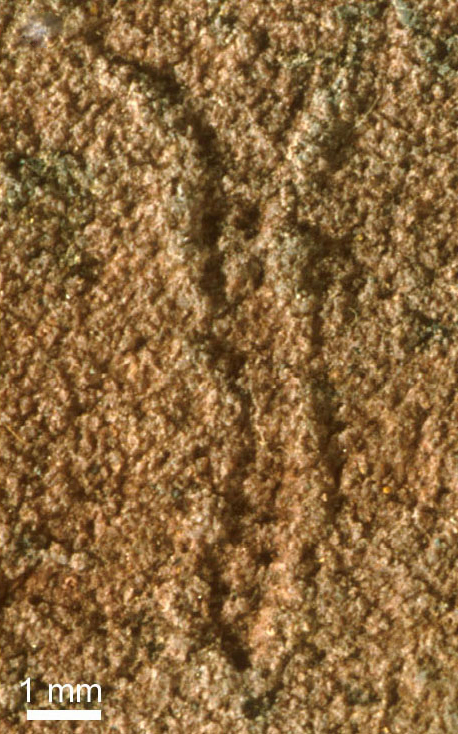
Detail of levees in flaring portion of trail of Myxomitodes stirlingensis.

== Description ==
Myxomitodes stirlingensis are irregular markings on the surface of beds, with the superficial appearance of animal trails. They are problematic for such trails because of their great geological age. Unlike fossil trails made by slugs or worms, Myxomitodes flare and vary in width. Worm and slug trails are long, so generally run off the edges of rock slabs. Myxomitodes in contrast is short, with one end tapering and the other forming a bulbous structure.

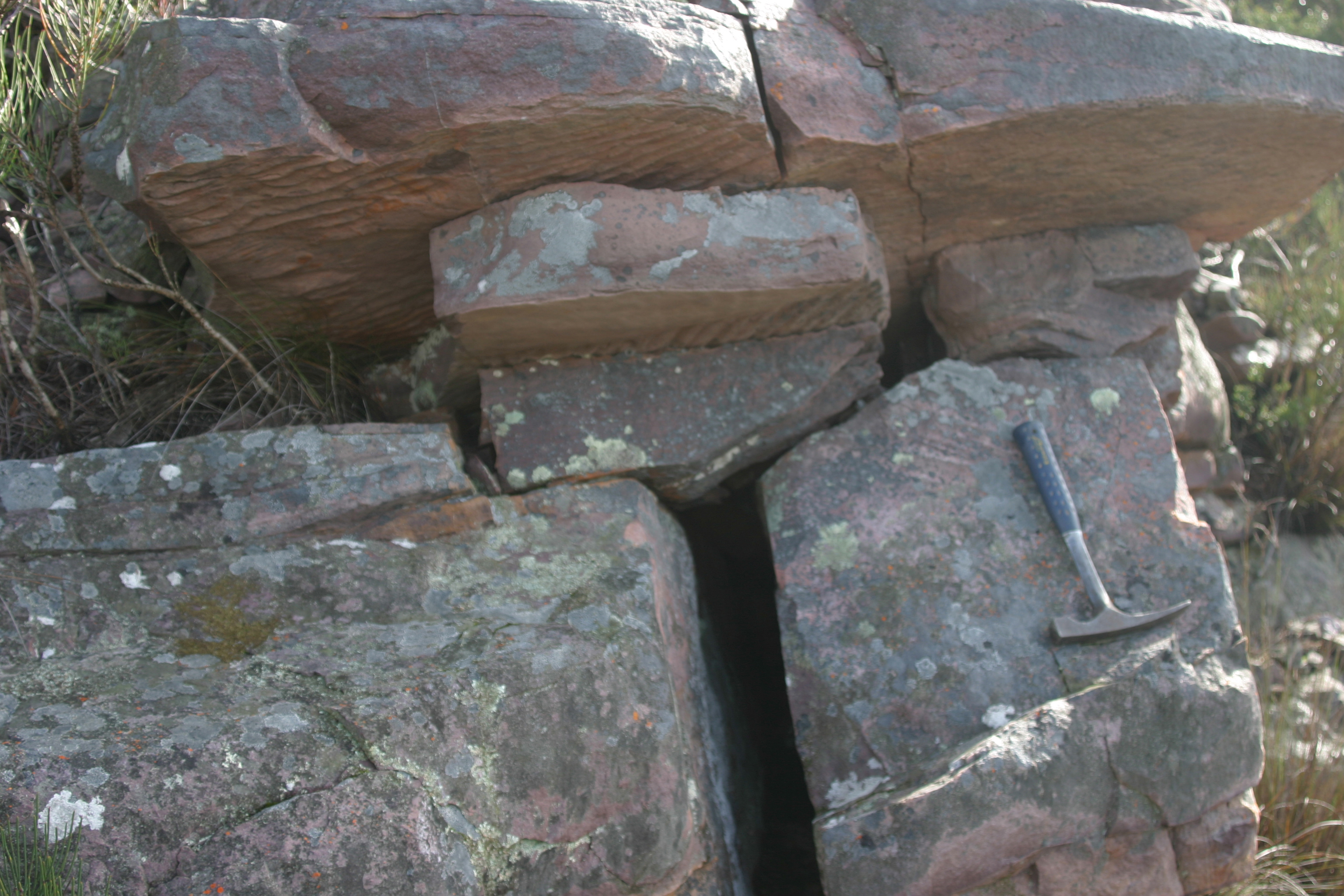
Cross section of a small ancient gully with Myxomitodes fossils in the Stirling Range Formation of Western Australia.

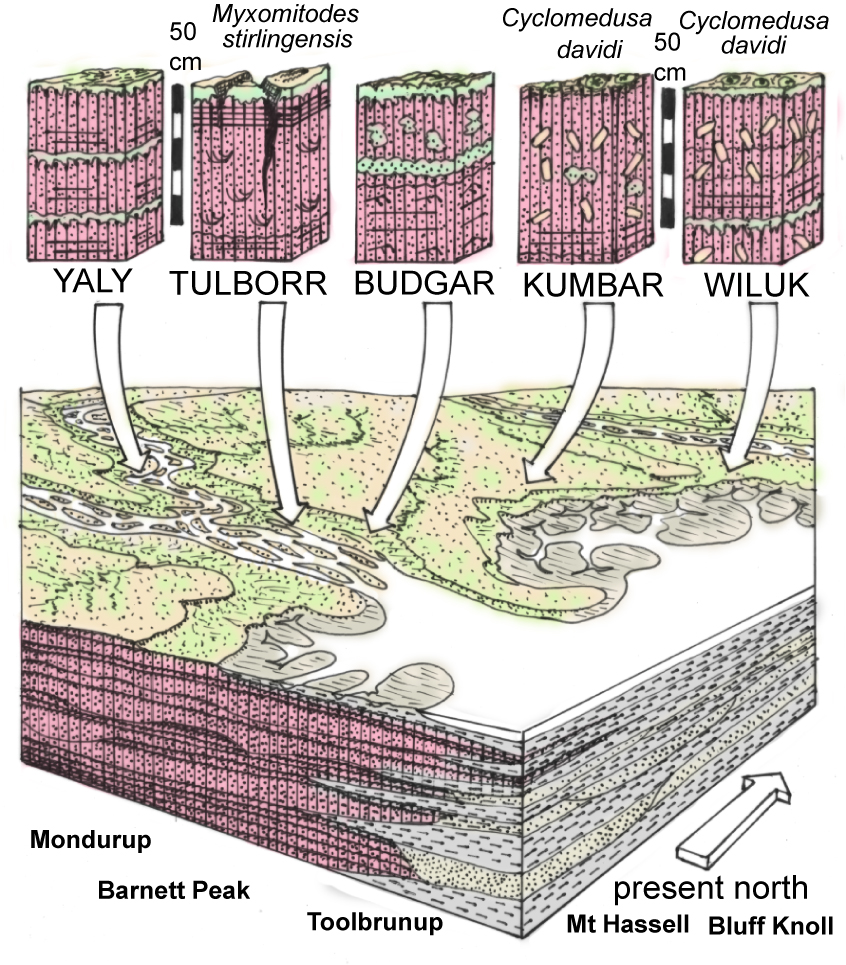
Reconstruction of paleosols and life on land in the 1900 billion year old Stirling range Formation of Western Australia.

== Biological affinities ==
Myxomitodes stirlingensis is a problematic fossil of controversial biological affinities. At first it was interpreted as a trail of a soft-bodied worm-like animal, and then as a trail of wind blown bubbles. Later it was suggested to be a trace of a giant globular, marine amoeba, similar to Gromia. Discovery of a variety of paleosols associated with Myxomitodes suggests that it might have lived on land like dictyostelid slime molds. These are dispersed soil amoebae for most of their life cycle, but occasionally stream together to form a grex, or slug-like multicellular aggregate that moves a short distance to form a sporulating stalk. This explanation explains the flaring shape (from cellular aggregation), levees (from slime trail), short length (migration distance) and bulbous ends (base of sporulating stalk). However, the fossil is older than the oldest currently accepted amoebozoans, bringing this interpretation into doubt.
