= Dictyostelium purpureum =

Scientific classification
- Domain: Eukaryota
- Clade: Amorphea
- Phylum: Amoebozoa
- Class: Dictyostelia
- Order: Dictyosteliida
- Family: Dictyosteliidae
- Genus: Dictyostelium
- Species: D. purpureum

Binomial name
- Dictyostelium purpureum Brefeld, 1869

Species of slime mould

Dictyostelium purpureum is a species of Dictyostelium.

Dictyostelium purpureum is a distinct species from D. discoideum, although it belongs in the same phenotypic grouping. Like D. discoideum, it exhibits a robust multicellular life cycle, and shares some of the early signaling molecules with D. discoideum. Both species spend vegetative growth preying on bacteria in the soil, and when starved, aggregate to enter multicellular development that culminates into a fruiting body with resistant viable spores (D. purpureum is so named for its strikingly purple spores), and supporting stalk structures.

== Altruism ==
Wild strains of D. purpureum were taken from the Houston Arboretum to a lab where they were cultured in dishes. In each of 14 experiments, a pair of strains were placed in a dish in equal proportion, and one of the strains in each pair was labeled with a fluorescent dye. Food was withheld, causing the microbes in each dish to form dozens of slugs and fruiting bodies. Upon observing their social development, the team found that individual fruiting bodies contained predominantly one strain or the other. This shows that an individual D. purpureum isn't going to offer itself to form a stalk unless it's sure that the rest of the aggregate, benefit from its sacrifice or a close relative. This demonstrated that molecular recognition of "self" and "close to self" (the basis of a modern immune system) happens even in primitive organisms.
