= C4orf17 =

Identifiers
- Aliases: C4orf17, chromosome 4 open reading frame 17
- External IDs: MGI: 1914991; HomoloGene: 12962; GeneCards: C4orf17; OMA:C4orf17 - orthologs

Gene location (Mouse)
| Chr. | Chromosome 3 (mouse) |
| Band | 3|3 G3 | Start | 137,869,839 bp |
| Band | 3|3 G3 | End | 137,945,424 bp |
RNA expression pattern
| Bgee | Human / Mouse (ortholog); Top expressed in: sperm; upper respiratory tract; right uterine tube; muscle; gastric mucosa; kidney; monocyte; prefrontal cortex; integument; lower leg / Top expressed in: spermatid; seminiferous tubule; spermatocyte; proximal tubule; right kidney; genital tubercle; islet of Langerhans; human kidney; More reference expression data |
| BioGPS | n/a |
Orthologs
| Species | Human | Mouse |
| Entrez | 84103 | 67741 |
| Ensembl | n/a | ENSMUSG00000012042 |
| UniProt | Q53FE4 | n/a |
| RefSeq (mRNA) | NM_032149 | NM_001163385; NM_001163386; NM_001374685 |
| RefSeq (protein) | NP_115525 | n/a |
| Location (UCSC) | n/a | Chr 3: 137.87 – 137.95 Mb |
| PubMed search |
- Wikidata
| View/Edit Human | View/Edit Mouse |

Chromosome 4 open reading frame 17 (C4orf17), is a protein-coding gene in humans. C4orf17 (accession: NP_115525.2) spans approximately 31,289 base pairs on the plus strand of chromosome 4 at gene locus 4q23. It has a molecular weight of approximately 39.6 kDa.

C4orf17
Structure of C4orf17 in Homo sapiens
Identifiers
| Aliases | dkfzp434g072, Q53FE4, chromosome 4 open reading frame 17, Ci-Spatial | | |
| External IDs | UniProt: Q53FE4; GeneCards: GC04P099511; HGNC ID: HGNC:25274; NCBI Gene ID: 84103; Ensembl: ENSG00000138813 | | |
| Accession numbers (Homo sapiens) | NM_032149 (mRNA) and NP_115525 (protein) | | |
Gene location (human)
Human Chromosome 4
| Chromosome | Chromosome 4 (human) | | |
Location of the C4orf17 gene in humans.
| Band | 4q23 | Start | chr4: 99,511,012 bp |
| Orientation | Plus (+) strand | End | chr4: 99,542,303 bp |
Gene location (mouse)
The C4orf17 ortholog is found on chromosome 3 in mice.
| Chromosome | Chromosome 3 (mouse) | | |
| Band | 3 G3; 3 64.1 cM | Start | chr3: 137,869,839 bp |
| Orientation | Complement (-) strand | End | chr3: 137,899.892 bp |
RNA Expression pattern
| | Human | Mouse (ortholog) | |
| Bgee | Top expressed in: Left ventricle myocardium; Buccal mucosa cell; Sperm; Male germline stem cell (in testes) | Top expressed in: Left ventricle myocardium; Buccal mucosa cell; Sperm; Male germline stem cell (in testes) | |
| BioGPS | Testes; Sperm | Testes | |

== mRNA ==
C4orf17 has a total of three known splice variants. There are 9 exons found within C4orf17's mRNA sequence. The two additional isoforms have 10 and 7 exons, respectively.

Table 1: mRNA Variants
| mRNA variant | Variant identifier | mRNA length | Protein length | Exons |
|---|---|---|---|---|
| NM_032149.3 | Q53FE4 | ~31K bp | 359 aa | 9 |
| XM_011532315.3 | Q53FE4-1 | ~31K bp | 186 aa | 10 |
| XM_054350982.1 | Q53FE4-2 | ~23K bp | 93 aa | 7 |

== Protein ==
The C4orf17 gene encodes the Q53FE4 protein, otherwise knowns as the C4orf17 protein.

=== Expression ===
In Ciona intestinalis, Ci-Spatial/C4orf17 is an essential part of beta-catenin signaling pathways in early embryonic development. Researchers isolated various cDNA clones and injected them with specific morpholinos. As a result, this study suggests that it is possible that Ci-Spatial/C4orf17 is involved in nuclear translocation of Ci-beta-catenin or enhancement of transcriptional activation.

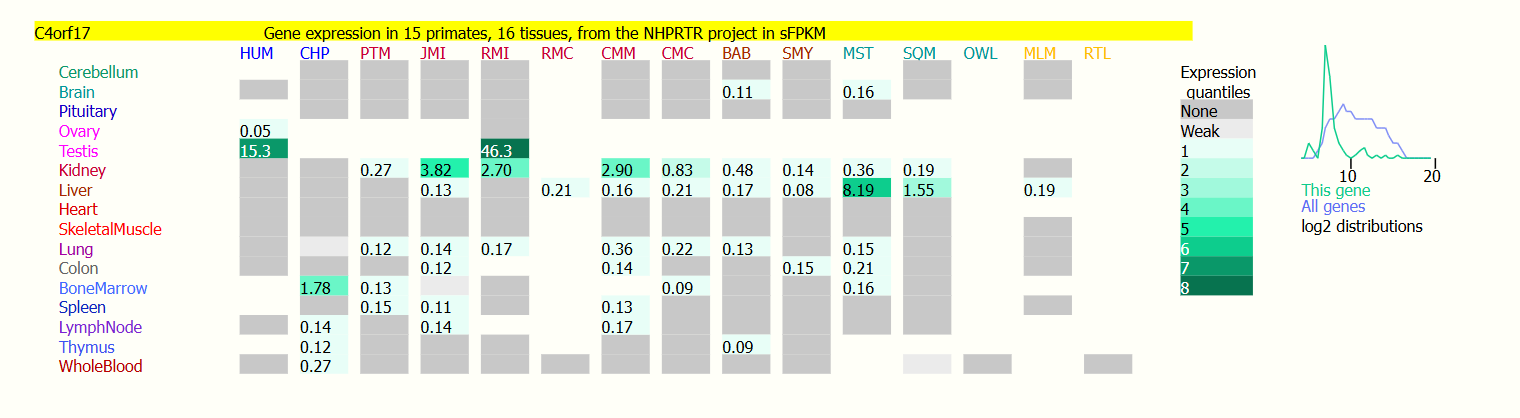
Figure 1: C4orf17 expression in various tissues across 15 primates.

In humans, there is notable expression of C4orf17 in the testes and early spermatids.

=== Promoter ===
One of the promoters for the human C4orf17 gene is Alcohol Dehydrogenase 6 (ADH6), located on chr4:99,404,578-99,405,078 (500 nucleotides.) It acts as a catalyst dependent on nicotinamide adenine dinucleotide (NAD) oxidation of primary alcohols to corresponding aldehydes. It also oxidizes secondary alcohols to the corresponding ketones.

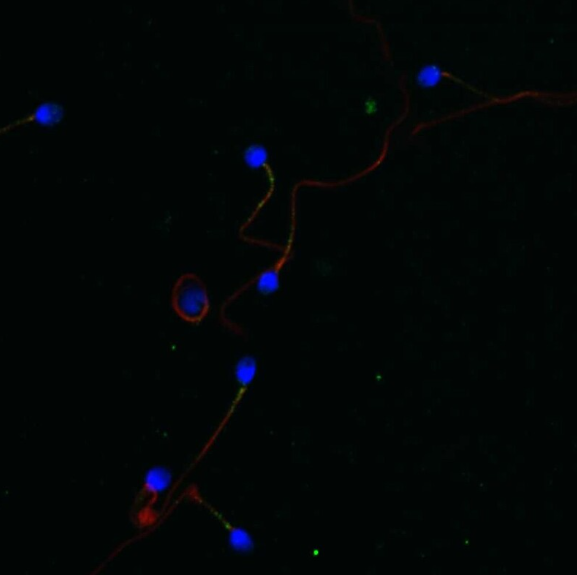
Figure 2: Immunofluorescent staining of human cell line. Sperm shows localization to mid piece

=== Localization ===
In humans, C4orf17 is specific to the testes. During human fetal development, however, C4orf17 expression appeared in adrenal, intestinal, and renal tissues at 20 weeks after conception.

=== Interactions ===
The C4orf17 protein interacts with numerous other proteins, such as ATRX, CHD3, KAT2B, KDM1A, PRMT1, and SUV39H1. These specific interactions suggest that C4orf17’s function is associated with chromatin modifications through histone methylation.

In a 2006 study regarding Abetalipoproteinemia (ABL,) an autosomal recessive disorder caused by mutations of the MTP gene (and thus the microsomal triglyceride transfer protein,) researchers hypothesized their subject was homozygous for a genomic deletion. This deletion included the entire MTP gene, spanning the 4q23 region, which ultimately deleted C4orf17 among eight other genes. Many of these genes are a part of an alcohol dehydrogenase (ADH) gene cluster that essentially metabolizes ethanol, retinol, aliphatic alcohols, hydroxysteroids, and lipid peroxidation products. However, C4orf17 is not included in this cluster.

A 2022 study, nevertheless, further investigated the ADH gene cluster. According to the researchers, “Nucleotide variation in ADH genes can affect the catalytic properties of these enzymes and is associated with a variety of traits, including alcoholism and cancer,” (McQuillan et al., 2022). C4orf17 is one of the many genetic mutations listed as having a strong effect on ADH traits.

== Evolutionary aspects ==
=== Orthologs ===
C4orf17 has a total of 86 orthologs recorded in the Ensembl database as well as 331 listed in NCBI. There were no orthologs found among invertebrates, protists, fungi, plants, or bacteria and archaea. The C4orf17 gene likely arose approximately 463 million years ago

Table 2: Orthologs of C4orf17 protein in humans
| Taxonomic Class | Genus and species | Organism Common Name | NCBI Accession | Percent Identity (%) | Percent Similarity (%) | Length (aa) | Date of Divergence (MYA) |
|---|---|---|---|---|---|---|---|
| Mammalia | Homo sapiens | Human | NP_115525 | 100 | 100 | 359 | 0 |
| Reptilia | Anolis carolinensis | Green anole | XP_062838383 | 25.1 | 86 | 327 | 319 |
| Amphibia | Ambystoma mexicanum | Axolotl | XP_069486409.1 | 25.9 | 86 | 396 | 352 |
| Aves | Apteryx mantelli | North Island brown kiwi | XP_013806968.2 | 33 | 85 | 372 | 319 |
| Chondrichthyes | Heptranchias perlo | Sharpnose sevengill shark | XP_067828475.1 | 28.8 | 55 | 379 | 462 |
| Mammalia (Marsupialia) | Petaurus breviceps papuanus | Sugar glider | XP_068955299.1 | 45.9 | 62 | 333 | 160 |
| Mammalia (Primate) | Papio anubis | Olive baboon | XP_017814371.1 | 79.7 | 100 | 313 | 28.8 |
| Mammalia (Rodentia) | Castor canadensis | North American beaver | XP_020036598.2 | 67.2 | 99 | 366 | 87 |

Table 2: Percent identity accounts for exact matches, such as a DNA base or amino acids. Percent similarity accounts for identical and biochemically similar substitutions, such as substituted amino acids.

=== Paralogs ===
The C4orf17 protein is a SPATIAL (stromal protein associated with thymic and lymph node) domain-containing protein, specifically at the interval 27-223 aa. This suggests that it may be involved in spermatid differentiation. This family may also be referred to as “TBATA” or “TBATA-like.”

Protein Analysis Through Evolutionary Relationships (PANTHER) Classification System categorizes C4orf17 into the PTHR33772:SF2 protein family.

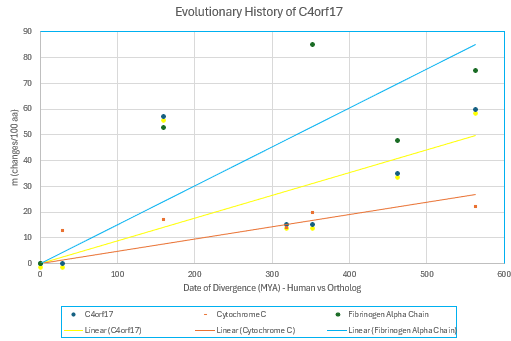
Figure 3: Date of Divergence (MYA): C4orf17 (yellow), cytochrome c (orange), fibrinogen alpha chain (blue)

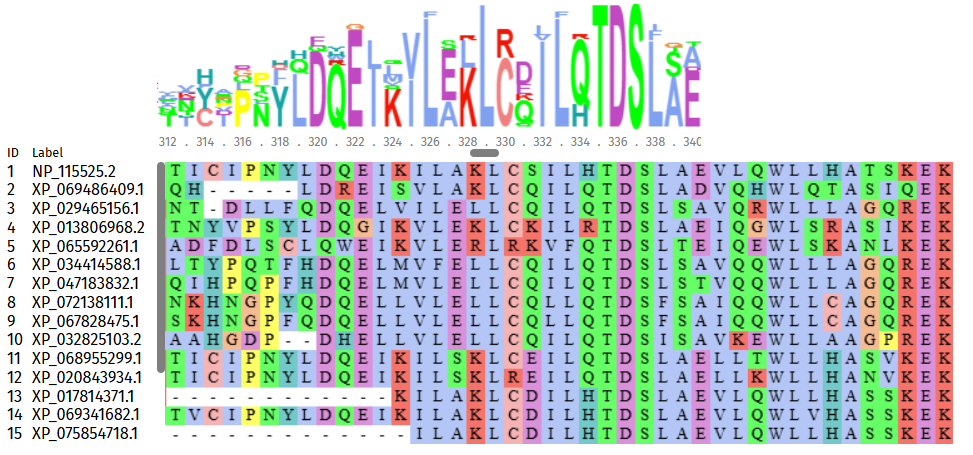
Figure 4: The following figures exhibit conserved regions of C4orf17 among the orthologs listed in Table #. The size of the letters at the top of each figure represents the degree of conservation. Larger letters indicate more conservation compared to smaller letters. Conserved regions of the C4orf17 protein Conserved regions of the C4orf17 protein

=== Protein Divergence ===
The figure to the right named "Date of Divergence..." exhibits the evolution of human C4orf17, cytochrome c, and fibrinogen alpha chain. Cytochrome C has a weaker slope indicating fewer mutations over time, while the fibrinogen alpha chain has a taller slope, meaning it has evolved quicker than both human C4orf17 and cytochrome c.

=== Multiple sequence alignment ===
Figure 4 displays the most conserved regions. Accession numbers on the left side of the images indicate the species including sea lamprey, turbot, cyclopterus, sharpnose sevengill shark, giant oceanic manta, rhinatrema, axolotl, Montequma quail, Norther Island brown kiwi, Komodo dragon, green anole, red-eared slider, Chinese softshell turtle, sugar glider, koala, Bennet's brown lemur, gray mouse lemur, North American beaver, Olive baboon, and human.

== Conceptual translation ==
Figure 5: Conceptual translation of (human) C4orf17 mRNA

Figure 5 exhibits a conceptual translation of C4orf17 in humans. It is annotated to highlight exons, start and stop codons, and disordered regions among other genetic features.

== SNPs ==
C4orf17 has a total of 14,681 SNPs recorded in the NCBI Variant Viewer, though only two are clinically significant. Variants rs1397320372 and rs1417597081 are both single nucleotide, missense variants.

Table 3: SNPs
| SNP | Position | Alleles | Type |
|---|---|---|---|
| rs1397320372 | chr4:99529854 | A>C / A>G | missense |
| rs1417597081 | chr4:99529903 | G>A / G>C / G>T | missense |
