= Macrocyst =

A macrocyst is an aggregate of cells of Dictyostelids formed during sexual reproduction enclosed in a cellulose wall.

If two amoebae of different mating types are present in a dark and wet environment, they can fuse during aggregation to form a giant cell. The giant cell will then engulf the other cells in the aggregate and encase the whole aggregate in a thick, cellulose wall to protect it. This is known as a macrocyst. Inside the macrocyst, the giant cell divides first through meiosis, then through mitosis to produce many haploid amoebae that will be released to feed as normal amoebae would.

== See also ==
- Life cycle and reproduction of Dictyostelium discoideum
