= Calospeira =

Scientific classification
- Domain: Eukaryota
- Class: Plasmodiophoromycetes
- Order: incertae sedis
- Family: Heimerliaceae
- Genus: Calospeira G. Arnaud 1949
- Species: C. elegans

Binomial name
- Calospeira elegans G. Arnaud 1949

Genus of slime moulds

Calospeira is a genus of slime mold containing the sole species Calospeira elegans.

== Description ==
Calospeira is a genus of slime molds, eukaryotic microbes capable of forming fruiting bodies called sorocarps. Its sorocarps are 730–1200 μm long, formed by a pedicel (stalk) supporting a sporangium. The pedicel is uniquely twisted below the sporangium, as opposed to similar genera that have a straight pedicel, such as Heimerlia and Heliomycopsis. The sporangia have columella and are 100—150 μm in diameter. The spores are ellipsoidal in shape, between 3.0 and 3.5 μm long.

== Taxonomy ==
The genus Calospeira and its type and only species Calospeira elegans were described in 1949 by mycologist Gabriel Arnaud. According to article 36.1 of the botanical code of nomenclature at the time, its name is taxonomically invalid due to lacking a Latin diagnosis. Since its description, it has not been reported by newer works. It was last mentioned in Michael W. Dick's 2001 work Straminipilous fungi, as part of the family Heimerliaceae, together with Heimerlia and other nomenclaturally invalid genera Rhabdocystis, Pygomyces, Heliomycopsis and Enigma. This family in turn was "provisionally placed in the Plasmodiophoromycetes".
