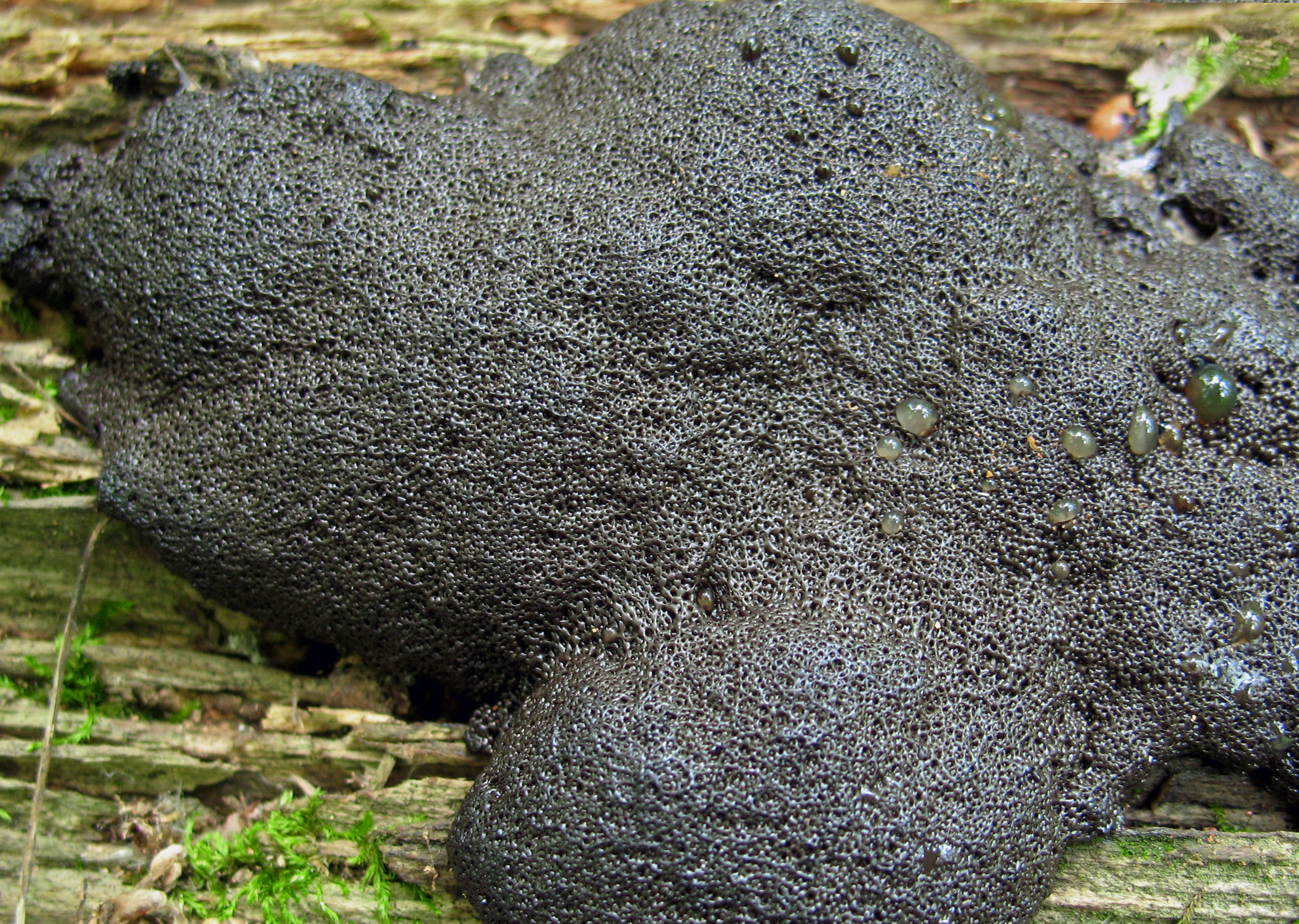
- The fruiting bodies of the myxomycete Lindbladia tubulina are often formed on wood of Scots pine (Pinus sylvestris).

Scientific classification
- Domain: Eukaryota
- Phylum: Amoebozoa
- Infraphylum: Mycetozoa
- Class: Myxogastria
- Order: Liceida
- Family: Cribrariaceae
- Genus: Lindbladia Fr., 1849
- Species: L. tubulina

Binomial name
- Lindbladia tubulina Fr. (1849)

= Lindbladia tubulina =

Species of slime mould

Lindbladia tubulina is a slime mould species from the order Liceida and the only member of its genus.

== Characteristics ==
The plasmodium is sepia-toned, brown-black or black. The fruiting body is usually pseudoaethalioid, occasionally aethalioid or on rare occasions even sporangiate. The fruiting bodies form dense groups which are mainly sessile or, rarely, borne on a stipe. The single sporangia are cylindric and create a spotted to cushion-shaped aethalium with a diameter from 1 to 15 cm (0.39 to 5.91 in) and a thickness from 2 to 10 mm. Its thickened, black or dark brown surface is composed of incompletely developed peridium walls and spores, and covers the ochre- to olive-brown interior. The endings of the single sporangia are slightly rough up to distinctly curved outwards and spherical. Their diameter is from 0.4 to 0.8 mm.

The distinctive, spongy hypothallus is occasionally membranous, but often multi-layered and produces a permanent subsurface for the fruit body. The peridium is an iridescent, consistently membranous layer. It is smooth on the edges and partly smooth, partly veined and mostly irregularly covered with the small hollows, which have a diameter from 0.4 to 0.8 μm and can be thickened on the edge. Dictydian granules are found in the shape darker or colourless pellets, which have a diameter from 0.8 to 1,8 μm.

A capillitium or pseudocapillitium is lacking. The spores are as spore mass ochre to olive brown, in transmitted light faint-coloured. They are round and have a diameter from 5 to 7 μm, but dictydian pellets are generally absent. Its surface is sharply sculptured and occasionally produces a reticular structure. In transmitted light they appear finely thorned.

== Habitat ==
Lindbladia tubulina is widely distributed. It has been found in Sri Lanka, Japan, North America from Canada to Texas, and in Europe from Scandinavia to Portugal. It is not found in the Neotropics. Many specimens are found on deadwood, brushwood or conifer needles, and rarely on the wood of deciduous trees. Seasonally they appear from late springtime (April) to early autumn (October).

== Classification ==
The species was first described in 1849 by Elias Magnus Fries. The holotype was found in a collection from Södermanland, Sweden, from 1845 by Matts Adolf Lindblad (1821−1899), who is honoured with the genus name. The specific epithet tubulina refers to the tubular sporangia, of which the pseudoaethalium is composed.

Occasionally, further species in Lindbladia have been characterized, but they have mostly been reduced to synonymy with this species, so the genus is considered monotypic.
