= Acytostelium =

Scientific classification
- Domain: Eukaryota
- Phylum: Amoebozoa
- Infraphylum: Mycetozoa
- Class: Dictyostelia
- Order: Dictyosteliida
- Family: Dictyosteliidae
- Genus: Acytostelium Raper 1956

Species
- Several, see text

Genus of slime moulds

Acytostelium is a genus of dictyostelid.

The genus Acytostelium inhabit surface humus and leaf mold of forest soils and are widely distributed in different forests of the world.

Species include:

- Acytostelium aggregatum Cavender & Vadell 2000
- Acytostelium amazonicum Cavender & Vadell 2000
- Acytostelium anastomosans Cavender et al. 2005
- Acytostelium digitatum Cavender & Vadell 2000
- Acytostelium irregularosporum Hagiw. 1971
- Acytostelium leptosomum Raper 1956
- Acytostelium longisorophorum Cavender et al. 2005
- Acytostelium magniphorum Cavender & Vadell 2000
- Acytostelium magnisorum Cavender et al. 2005
- Acytostelium minutissimum Cavender & Vadell 2000
- Acytostelium pendulum Cavender & Vadell 2000
- Acytostelium reticulatum Cavender & Vadell 2000
- Acytostelium serpentarium Cavender et al. 2005
- Acytostelium singulare Cavender et al. 2005
- Acytostelium subglobosum Cavender 1976
