= DictyBase =

dictyBase

Content
- Description: genome portal for the Amoebozoa.

Contact
- Research center: Northwestern University
- Laboratory: dictyBase, Northwestern University Biomedical Informatics Center and Center for Genetic Medicine
- Authors: Pascale Gaudet
- Primary citation: Gaudet & al. (2011)
- Release date: 2004

Access
- Website: http://www.dictybase.org

dictyBase is an online bioinformatics database for the model organism Dictyostelium discoideum.

== Tools ==
dictyBase offers many ways of searching and retrieving data from the database:

- dictyMart - a tool for retrieving varied information on many genes (or the sequences of those genes).
- Genome Browser - browse the genes of D. discoideum in their genomic context.
