= Sentinel cell =

Type of immune cell

Sentinel cells refer to cells in the body's first line of defense, which embed themselves in tissues such as skin. Sentinel cells represent a diverse array of cell types with the capability to monitor the presence of exogenous or potentially harmful particles and play a crucial role in recognizing and sampling signs of infection or abnormal cellular activity and death. Encountering such stimuli is initiating the innate immune response. Their ability to recognize injurious or dangerous material is mediated by specialized pattern recognition receptors (PRR) and possess specialized function to prime naive T cells upon pathogen recognition.

Sentinel cells can refer to specific antigen-presenting cells, such as:

- Macrophages
  - Kupffer cells – in the liver
  - Langerhans cells – in the skin and mucosa (*these are a form of dendritic cell)
  - Alveolar macrophages – in the lungs
  - Microglia – in the brain
- Dendritic cells

Sentinel cells can also refer to cells that are normally not specialized antigen-presenting cells such as:

- Mast cells
- Specialized T cells

Sometimes tissue cells not part of the immune system such as are also referred to as Sentinel cells:

- Fibroblasts
- Epithelial cells

== Location ==
Typically, dendritic cells (DCs) and macrophages serve this function by being strategically distributed throughout diverse tissues within host environment particularly in those regions exposed to the contact with the external environment such as mucosal tissues and skin.

== Function ==
In elucidating the intricate network of phenotypic markers characterizing sentinel cells residing in skin there is a recent study offering an in-depth exploration whereas stimulus-specific gene expression and functions are described in the summarized article.

== Use in science ==
Novel function has been discovered by designing sentinel bacterium Bacillus subtilis, combining the living organism with evolutionary function of sentinels, resulting in surveillance of specific DNA sequences and reporting single nucleotide polymorphism associated with facial features through the mechanism by which these sentinel cells take up and record target DNA sequences, using CRISPR interference for SNP differentiation and expression of the target gene. This technology demonstrates potential applications in areas like forensics, ecology, and epidemiology, by enabling the detection of specific DNA sequences in various environments. Application of such DNA-specific surveillance can be designed in detection of an anomaly and targeting the localized treatment to identified tissue such as tumors.
