= Multicellular organism =

Organism that consists of more than one cell

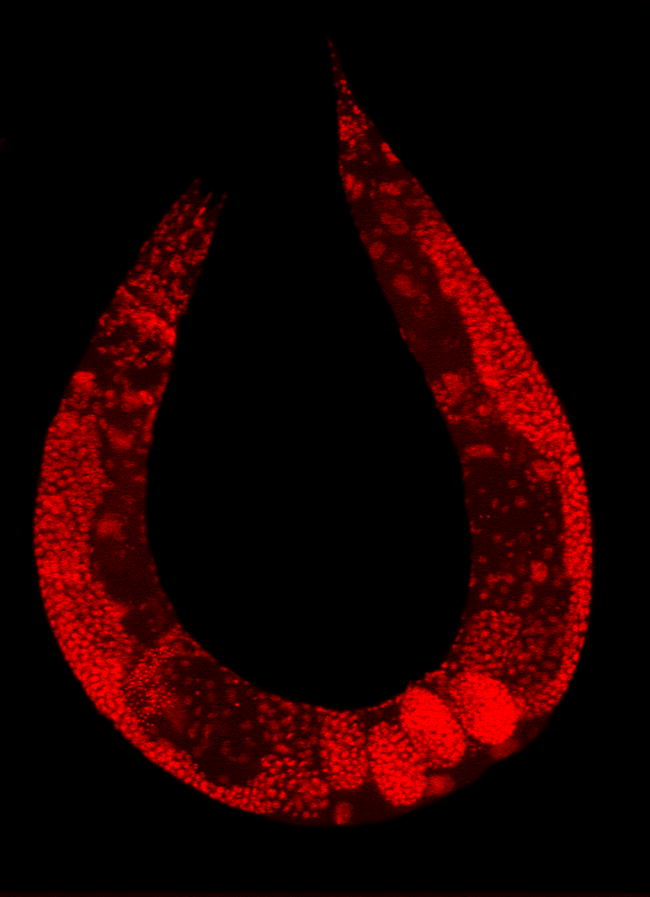
The nematode Caenorhabditis elegans stained to highlight the nuclei of its cells

A multicellular organism is an organism that consists of more than one cell, and more than one cell type, unlike unicellular organisms. All species of animals, land plants and most fungi are multicellular, as are many algae, whereas a few organisms are partially uni- and partially multicellular, like slime molds and social amoebae such as the genus Dictyostelium.

Multicellular organisms arise in various ways, for example by cell division or by aggregation of many single cells. Colonial organisms are the result of many identical individuals joining together to form a colony. However, it can often be hard to separate colonial protists from true multicellular organisms, because the two concepts are not distinct; colonial protists have been dubbed "pluricellular" rather than "multicellular". There are also macroscopic organisms that are multinucleate though technically unicellular, such as the Xenophyophorea that can reach 20 cm.

== Evolutionary history ==
=== Occurrence ===
Multicellularity has evolved independently at least 25 times in eukaryotes, and also in some prokaryotes, like cyanobacteria, myxobacteria, actinomycetes or Magnetoglobus multicellularis. However, complex multicellular organisms evolved only in six eukaryotic groups: animals, symbiomycotan fungi, brown algae, red algae, green algae, and land plants. It evolved repeatedly for Chloroplastida (green algae and land plants), once for animals, once for brown algae, three times in the fungi (chytrids, ascomycetes, and basidiomycetes) and perhaps several times for slime molds and red algae. To reproduce, true multicellular organisms must solve the problem of regenerating a whole organism from germ cells (i.e., sperm and egg cells), an issue that is studied in evolutionary developmental biology. Animals have evolved a considerable diversity of cell types in a multicellular body (100–150 different cell types), compared with 10–20 in plants and fungi.

The first evidence of multicellular organization, which is when unicellular organisms coordinate behaviors and may be an evolutionary precursor to true multicellularity, is from cyanobacteria-like organisms that lived 3.0–3.5 billion years ago. Decimeter-scale multicellular fossils have been found as early as 1.56 Bya.

=== Loss of multicellularity ===
Loss of multicellularity has occurred in some groups. Fungi are predominantly multicellular, though early diverging lineages are largely unicellular (e.g., Microsporidia) and there have been numerous reversions to unicellularity across fungi (e.g., Saccharomycotina, Cryptococcus, and other yeasts). It may also have occurred in some red algae (e.g., Porphyridium), but they may be primitively unicellular. Loss of multicellularity is also considered probable in some green algae (e.g., Chlorella vulgaris and some Ulvophyceae).

Some animal groups, generally parasites, have experienced a reduction of multicellularity; in these taxa, the number of cell types has secondarily decreased. A group of cnidarians known as myxozoans are particularly reduced. Some members of this clade experience single-celled life phases known as plasmodia and pseudoplasmodia; within these cells, multicellular spores develop. Rhizocephalan barnacles experience similar, highly reduced phases when their larva inject small clusters of cells into their decapod hosts, which will become the adult form.

=== Cancer ===
Multicellular organisms, especially long-living animals, face the challenge of cancer, which occurs when cells fail to regulate their growth within the normal program of development. Changes in tissue morphology can be observed during this process. Many genes responsible for the establishment of multicellularity that originated around the appearance of metazoans are deregulated in cancer cells, including genes that control cell differentiation, adhesion and cell-to-cell communication. There is a discussion about the possibility of existence of cancer in other multicellular organisms or even in protozoa. For example, plant galls have been characterized as tumors, but some authors argue that plants do not develop cancer.

=== Separation of somatic and germ cells ===
In some multicellular groups, which are called Weismannists, a separation between a sterile somatic cell line and a germ cell line evolved. However, Weismannist development is relatively rare (e.g., vertebrates, arthropods, Volvox), as a great part of species have the capacity for somatic embryogenesis (e.g., land plants, most algae, many invertebrates).

== Origin hypotheses ==
Tetrabaena socialis consists of four cells.

One hypothesis for the origin of multicellularity is that a group of function-specific cells aggregated into a slug-like mass called a grex, which moved as a multicellular unit. This is essentially what slime molds do. Another hypothesis is that a primitive cell underwent nucleus division, thereby becoming a coenocyte. A membrane would then form around each nucleus (and the cellular space and organelles occupied in the space), thereby resulting in a group of connected cells in one organism (this mechanism is observable in Drosophila). A third hypothesis is that as a unicellular organism divided, the daughter cells failed to separate, resulting in a conglomeration of identical cells in one organism, which could later develop specialized tissues. This is what plant and animal embryos do as well as colonial choanoflagellates.

Because the first multicellular organisms were simple, soft organisms lacking bone, shell, or other hard body parts, they are not well preserved in the fossil record. One exception may be the demosponge, which may have left a chemical signature in ancient rocks. The earliest fossils of multicellular organisms include the contested Grypania spiralis and the fossils of the black shales of the Palaeoproterozoic Francevillian Group Fossil B Formation in Gabon (Gabonionta). The Doushantuo Formation has yielded 600 million year old microfossils with evidence of multicellular traits.

Until recently, phylogenetic reconstruction has been through anatomical (particularly embryological) similarities. This is inexact, as living multicellular organisms such as animals and plants are more than 500 million years removed from their single-cell ancestors. Such a passage of time allows both divergent and convergent evolution time to mimic similarities and accumulate differences between groups of modern and extinct ancestral species. Modern phylogenetics uses sophisticated techniques such as alloenzymes, satellite DNA and other molecular markers to describe traits that are shared between distantly related lineages.

The evolution of multicellularity could have occurred in several different ways, some of which are described below:

=== The symbiotic theory ===
This theory suggests that the first multicellular organisms occurred from symbiosis (cooperation) of different species of single-cell organisms, each with different roles. Over time these organisms would become so dependent on each other that they would not be able to survive independently, eventually leading to the incorporation of their genomes into one multicellular organism. Each respective organism would become a separate lineage of differentiated cells within the newly created species.

This kind of severely co-dependent symbiosis can be seen frequently, such as in the relationship between clown fish and Riterri sea anemones. In these cases, it is extremely doubtful whether either species would survive very long if the other became extinct. However, the problem with this theory is that it is still not known how each organism's DNA could be incorporated into one single genome to constitute them as a single species. Although such symbiosis is theorized to have occurred (e.g., mitochondria and chloroplasts in animal and plant cells—endosymbiosis), it has happened only extremely rarely and, even then, the genomes of the endosymbionts have retained an element of distinction, separately replicating their DNA during mitosis of the host species. For instance, the two or three symbiotic organisms forming the composite lichen, although dependent on each other for survival, have to separately reproduce and then re-form to create one individual organism once more.

=== The cellularization (syncytial) theory ===
This theory states that a single unicellular organism, with multiple nuclei, could have developed internal membrane partitions around each of its nuclei. Many protists such as the ciliates or slime molds can have several nuclei, lending support to this hypothesis. However, the simple presence of multiple nuclei is not enough to support the theory. Multiple nuclei of ciliates are dissimilar and have clear differentiated functions. The macronucleus serves the organism's needs, whereas the micronucleus is used for sexual reproduction with exchange of genetic material. Slime molds syncitia form from individual amoeboid cells, like syncitial tissues of some multicellular organisms, not the other way round. To be deemed valid, this theory needs a demonstrable example and mechanism of generation of a multicellular organism from a pre-existing syncytium.

=== The colonial theory ===
The colonial theory of Haeckel, 1874, proposes that the symbiosis of many organisms of the same species (unlike the symbiotic theory, which suggests the symbiosis of different species) led to a multicellular organism. At least some – it is presumed land-evolved – multicellularity occurs by cells separating and then rejoining (e.g., cellular slime molds) whereas for the majority of multicellular types (those that evolved within aquatic environments), multicellularity occurs as a consequence of cells failing to separate following division. The mechanism of this latter colony formation can be as simple as incomplete cytokinesis, though multicellularity is also typically considered to involve cellular differentiation.

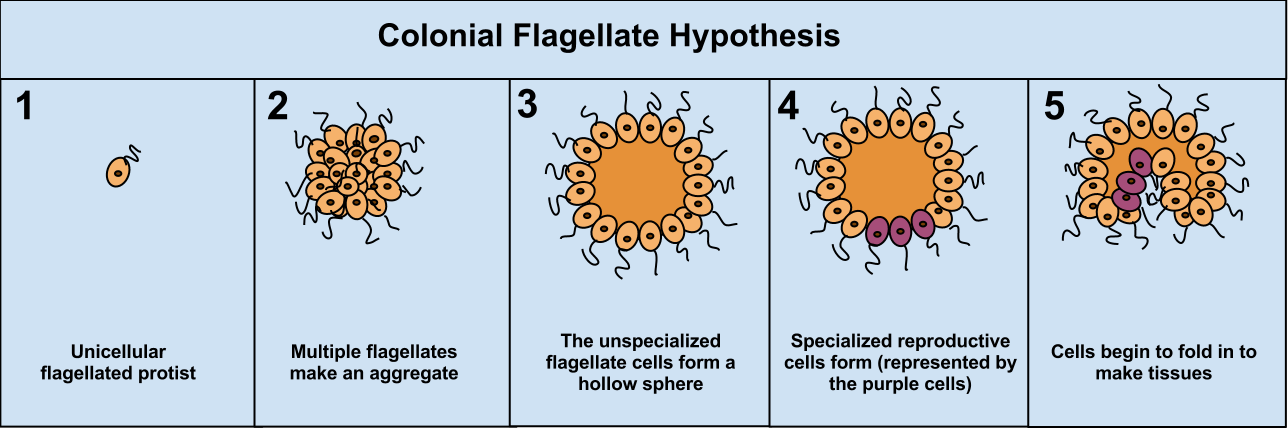

The advantage of the Colonial Theory hypothesis is that it has been seen to occur independently in 16 different protoctistan phyla. For instance, during food shortages the amoeba Dictyostelium groups together in a colony that moves as one to a new location. Some of these amoeba then slightly differentiate from each other. Other examples of colonial organisation in protista are Volvocaceae, such as Eudorina and Volvox, the latter of which consists of up to 500–50,000 cells (depending on the species), only a fraction of which reproduce. For example, in one species 25–35 cells reproduce, 8 asexually and around 15–25 sexually. However, it can often be hard to separate colonial protists from true multicellular organisms, as the two concepts are not distinct; colonial protists have been dubbed "pluricellular" rather than "multicellular".

=== The synzoospore theory ===
Some authors suggest that the origin of multicellularity, at least in Metazoa, occurred due to a transition from temporal to spatial cell differentiation, rather than through a gradual evolution of cell differentiation, as affirmed in Haeckel's gastraea theory.

=== GK-PID ===
About 800 million years ago, a minor genetic change in a single molecule called guanylate kinase protein-interaction domain (GK-PID) may have allowed organisms to go from a single cell organism to one of many cells.

=== The role of viruses ===
Genes borrowed from viruses and mobile genetic elements (MGEs) have recently been identified as playing a crucial role in the differentiation of multicellular tissues and organs and even in sexual reproduction, in the fusion of egg cells and sperm. Such fused cells are also involved in metazoan membranes such as those that prevent chemicals from crossing the placenta and the brain body separation. Two viral components have been identified. The first is syncytin, which came from a virus. The second identified in 2002 is called EFF-1, which helps form the skin of Caenorhabditis elegans, part of a whole family of FF proteins. Felix Rey, of the Pasteur Institute in Paris, has constructed the 3D structure of the EFF-1 protein and shown it does the work of linking one cell to another, in viral infections. The fact that all known cell fusion molecules are viral in origin suggests that they have been vitally important to the inter-cellular communication systems that enabled multicellularity. Without the ability of cellular fusion, colonies could have formed, but anything even as complex as a sponge would not have been possible.

=== Oxygen availability hypothesis ===
This theory suggests that the oxygen available in the atmosphere of early Earth could have been the limiting factor for the emergence of multicellular life. This hypothesis is based on the correlation between the emergence of multicellular life and the increase of oxygen levels during this time. This would have taken place after the Great Oxidation Event but before the most recent rise in oxygen. Mills concludes that the amount of oxygen present during the Ediacaran is not necessary for complex life and therefore is unlikely to have been the driving factor for the origin of multicellularity.

=== Snowball Earth hypothesis ===
A snowball Earth event is a geological event where the entire surface of the Earth is covered in snow and ice. Snowball events are thought to have happened several times throughout the Earth's history, and during the Cryogenian, two snowball events happened in quick succession – the Sturtian and Marinoan glaciations.

These glaciations could have been the catalyst for the evolution of complex multicellular life. The time between the Sturtian and Marinoan glaciations may have allowed for planktonic algae to dominate the seas, making way for rapid diversification of biota for both plant and animal lineages. Complex life quickly emerged and diversified in what is known as the Cambrian explosion shortly after the Marinoan.

Xiao et al. suggest that between the period of time known as the "Boring Billion" and the snowball Earth, simple life could have had time to innovate and evolve, which could later lead to the evolution of multicellularity.

=== Predation hypothesis ===
The predation hypothesis suggests that to avoid being eaten by predators, simple single-celled organisms evolved multicellularity to make it harder to be consumed as prey. Herron et al. performed laboratory evolution experiments on the single-celled green alga, Chlamydomonas reinhardtii, using paramecium as a predator. They found that in the presence of this predator, C. reinhardtii does indeed evolve simple multicellular features.

== Experimental evolution ==
It is impossible to know what happened when single cells evolved into multicellular organisms hundreds of millions of years ago. However, we can identify mutations that can turn single-celled organisms into multicellular ones. This would demonstrate the possibility of such an event. Unicellular species can relatively easily acquire mutations that make them attach to each other—the first step towards multicellularity. Multiple normally unicellular species have been evolved to exhibit such early steps:

- Yeast are long known to exhibit flocculation. One of the first yeast genes found to cause this phenotype is FLO1. A more strikingly clumped phenotype is called "snowflake", caused by the loss of a single transcription factor Ace2. "Snowflake" yeast grow into multicellular clusters that sediment quickly; they were identified by directed evolution. More recently (2024), snowflake yeast were subject to over 3,000 generations of further directed evolution, forming macroscopic assemblies on the scale of millimeters. Changes in multiple genes were identified. In addition, the authors reported that only anaerobic cultures of snowflake yeast evolved this trait, while the aerobic ones did not.
- A range of green algae species have been experimentally evolved to form larger clumps. When Chlorella vulgaris is grown with a predator Ochromonas vallescia, it starts forming small colonies, which are harder to ingest due to the larger size. The same is true for Chlamydomonas reinhardtii under predation by Brachionus calyciflorus and Paramecium tetraurelia.

C. reinhartii normally starts as a motile single-celled propagule; this single cell asexually reproduces by undergoing 2–5 rounds of mitosis as a small clump of non-motile cells, then all cells become single-celled propagules and the clump dissolves. With a few generations under Paramecium predation, the "clump" becomes a persistent structure: only some cells become propagules. Some populations go further and evolved multi-celled propagules: instead of peeling off single cells from the clump, the clump now reproduces by peeling off smaller clumps.

== Advantages ==
Multicellularity allows an organism to exceed the size limits normally imposed by diffusion: single cells with increased size have a decreased surface-to-volume ratio and have difficulty absorbing sufficient nutrients and transporting them throughout the cell. Multicellular organisms thus have the competitive advantages of an increase in size without its limitations. They can have longer lifespans as they can continue living when individual cells die. Multicellularity also permits increasing complexity by allowing differentiation of cell types within one organism.

Whether all of these can be seen as advantages however is debatable: The vast majority of living organisms are single celled, and even in terms of biomass, single celled organisms are far more successful than animals, although not plants. Rather than seeing traits such as longer lifespans and greater size as an advantage, many biologists see these only as examples of diversity, with associated tradeoffs.

== Gene expression changes in the transition from uni- to multicellularity ==
During the evolutionary transition from unicellular organisms to multicellular organisms, the expression of genes associated with reproduction and survival likely changed. In the unicellular state, genes associated with reproduction and survival are expressed in a way that enhances the fitness of individual cells, but after the transition to multicellularity, the pattern of expression of these genes must have substantially changed so that individual cells become more specialized in their function relative to reproduction and survival. As the multicellular organism emerged, gene expression patterns became compartmentalized between cells that specialized in reproduction (germline cells) and those that specialized in survival (somatic cells). As the transition progressed, cells that specialized tended to lose their own individuality and would no longer be able to both survive and reproduce outside the context of the group.

== See also ==
- Bacterial colony
- Embryogenesis
- Organogenesis
- Unicellular organism
- Superorganism
