= Differentiation-inducing factor =

Effector molecule that inhibits cell growth and promotes cellular differentiation

Differentiation-inducing factor 1

Differentiation-inducing factor 2

Differentiation-inducing factor 3

Differentiation-inducing factor (DIF) is one of a class of effector molecules that induce changes in cell chemistry, inhibiting growth and promoting differentiation of cell type. This name has been given to several factors before it was clear if they were the same or different effectors. DIFs have garnered interest with their potential tumor inhibiting properties. DIFs have also been used to help regulate plant growth.

== Differentiation-inducing factors 1-3 ==
=== Initial studies ===
Dictyostelium discoideum has been used since the 1940s to study cellular and developmental biology. It is well-suited for this research because it only develops two types of cells (stalk and spore) during morphogenesis. Each cell type has a distinct physical origin within the organism; pre-stalk cells coming from the anterior side and pre-spore cells from the posterior. Early evidence showed the differentiation of dense patches of pre-stalk cells were induced by cyclic AMP (cAMP) along with "a factor" that was likely low in molecular weight and able to diffuse across membranes. The structures for DIF-1, DIF-2, and DIF-3 were identified as these factors for stalk differentiation and subsequently synthesized to further research into implications for developmental biology. DIFs 1-3 are chlorinated hexaphenones (phenylalkan-1-ones, with chloro, hydroxy and methoxy substitution on the benzene ring), and have been isolated from Dictyostelium discoideum slime mold.

Some research has shown that they have a role in controlling chemotaxis of Dictyostelium discoideum, too. DIF-1 and DIF-3 are related in structure and function. DIF-3 is formed from the first step in the breakdown of DIF-1. In this state DIF-3 only performs about 3.5% as much of the activity of its predecessor. DIF-2 is unrelated to DIFs -1 and -3, but it works 40% as well as DIF-1 does to induce differentiation in stalk cells. Despite this similarity in function during differentiation, DIFs -1 and -2 act very differently in chemotactic movement of the cells toward cAMP. DIF-1 has a slight inhibitory effect on movement of starved cells toward cAMP, while DIF-2 has a strong positive effect of movement of these cells toward cAMP. These effects are thought to be carried out through phosphodiesterase activations that impact cGMP production to impact chemotaxis. An increase in chemotaxis can be related to malignant migration of cancer cells.

=== Anti-tumor properties ===
Investigation into the anti-tumor properties of DIFs have followed one main line; the disruption of a pathway necessary for the cancer's uncontrolled growth reducing its proliferative ability. As mentioned above, the ability of DIF-1 to decrease movement of proliferating cells toward sources of energy could serve as an anti-tumor property. In another example, DIF-1 has been shown to reduce the proliferation of gastric cancer cells via upregulation of the MEK-ERK-dependent pathway. Other studies have shown how complicated the anti-tumor interactions of DIFs may be, especially when considering the indirect impacts DIFs have on target molecules. For instance, DIF-like molecules have been shown to inhibit cell growth and bring about cell death through uncoupling in mitochondria.

=== Expanding uses for DIF-like molecules ===
Derivatives of DIF-1 and DIF-3 have already been investigated with promising initial results. One group of derivatives yielded two DIF-1-like compounds that were effective in suppression of IL-2 production which could be helpful in controlling septic responses and other infections.

=== Running List of DIF and DIF-like molecule effects ===
- Inhibit proliferation of cancer cells (leukemia, cervical, gastric, and colon) (DIF -1 and/or -3)
- Reduces expression of Cyclin D mRNA and increases its degradation (DIF -1 and -3)
- Inhibition of ERK and STAT3 signaling (DIF -1)
- Inhibition of PAK1 activity in breast cancer cells (DIF-3 derivative)
- Suppression of IL-2 production (DIF-1 derivatives)
- Phosphorylation and dephosphorylation changes (DIF-1)
- Uncoupling in mitochondria (DIF-3)
- Inhibits PDE1(DIF-1)
