= Grex (biology) =

Aggregation of amoebae

Life cycle of Dictyostelium

A grex (also called a pseudoplasmodium, or slug) starts as a crowd of single-celled amoebae of the groups Acrasiomycota or Dictyosteliida; grex is the Latin word for flock. The cells flock together, forming a mass that behaves as an organised, slug-like unit. Before they get stimulated to crowd together to form a grex, the amoebae simply wander as independent cells grazing on bacteria and other suitable food items. They continue in that way of life as long as conditions are favourable. When the amoebae are stressed, typically by a shortage of food, they form a grex.

According to species and circumstances, details of the shape of the grex and how it may form will vary but typically the stressed amoebae first produce pheromones that stimulate the flock to vertically assemble in a column. When the column of aggregated cells becomes too high and narrow to stay upright, it topples and becomes a slug-shaped mass: the grex. The grex is mobile; in its form as a slug-like unit it can glide over a moist surface. Once it has moved far enough to complete its development, the cells of the amoebae differentiate according to their positions in the grex; some become the spore cells and the covering shell of the fruiting body near the tip, and others form structures such as the stalk. Cells forming the structural items, such as the stalk and shell, desiccate and die; only the spores in the fruiting body survive to propagate. When circumstances are right and the fruiting body is mature, its shell ruptures and releases the spores. The spores then may be transported by media such as wind or water; they then may cover distances far greater than any that they could have achieved in their amoeboid form, and over regions where amoebae could not travel at all, such as dry surfaces.

== See also ==
- Dictyosteliid
