= Sorocarp =

Fruiting body of cellular slime molds

A sorocarp (from the Greek word soros "a heap" and karpos "fruit") is the fruiting body characteristic of certain cellular slime moulds (e.g., Dictyosteliida). Each sorocarp consists of both a sorophore (stalk) and a sorus. Sorocarps release spores.
