= Spo11 =

Protein-coding gene in the species Homo sapiens

SPO11

Identifiers
- Aliases: SPO11, CT35, SPATA43, TOPVIA, initiator of meiotic double stranded breaks, SPO11 initiator of meiotic double stranded breaks, Meiotic recombination, Spo11, Meiotic_Spo11, IPR013048, Spo11, TOPOVIA
- External IDs: OMIM: 605114; MGI: 1349669; HomoloGene: 6059; GeneCards: SPO11; OMA:SPO11 - orthologs

Gene location (Human)
| Chr. | Chromosome 20 (human) |
| Band | 20q13.31 | Start | 57,329,803 bp |
| Band | 20q13.31 | End | 57,343,994 bp |

Gene location (Mouse)
| Chr. | Chromosome 2 (mouse) |
| Band | 2 H3|2 95.64 cM | Start | 172,819,493 bp |
| Band | 2 H3|2 95.64 cM | End | 172,835,369 bp |
RNA expression pattern
| Bgee | Human / Mouse (ortholog); Top expressed in: gonad; testicle; right testis; left testis; duodenum; somatic cell; muscle; muscle; skeletal muscle; mononuclear cell / Top expressed in: spermatocyte; seminiferous tubule; thymus; spermatid; Paneth cell; embryo; tail of embryo; hair follicle; genital tubercle; ovary; More reference expression data |
| BioGPS | n/a |
Gene ontology
| Molecular function | metal ion binding; catalytic activity; hydrolase activity; ATP binding; protein binding; isomerase activity; DNA topoisomerase type II (double strand cut, ATP-hydrolyzing) activity; endodeoxyribonuclease activity, producing 3'-phosphomonoesters; DNA binding |
| Cellular component | chromosome; telomere; nucleus; nuclear chromosome |
| Biological process | protein localization to chromosome; female gamete generation; meiotic telomere clustering; male meiosis I; DNA metabolic process; DNA catabolic process, endonucleolytic; oogenesis; homologous chromosome pairing at meiosis; meiosis; synaptonemal complex assembly; spermatogenesis; spermatid development; ovarian follicle development; meiotic DNA double-strand break processing; meiotic DNA double-strand break formation; reciprocal meiotic recombination; double-strand break repair involved in meiotic recombination |
Sources:Amigo / QuickGO
Orthologs
| Species | Human | Mouse |
| Entrez | 23626 | 26972 |
| Ensembl | ENSG00000054796 | ENSMUSG00000005883 |
| UniProt | Q9Y5K1; Q5TCH6 | Q9WTK8 |
| RefSeq (mRNA) | NM_012444; NM_198265 | NM_001083959; NM_001083960; NM_012046; NM_001305434 |
| RefSeq (protein) | NP_036576; NP_937998 | NP_001077428; NP_001077429; NP_001292363; NP_036176 |
| Location (UCSC) | Chr 20: 57.33 – 57.34 Mb | Chr 2: 172.82 – 172.84 Mb |
| PubMed search |
- Wikidata
| View/Edit Human | View/Edit Mouse |

Spo11 is a protein that in humans is encoded by the SPO11 gene. Spo11, in a complex with mTopVIB, creates double strand breaks to initiate meiotic recombination. Its active site contains a tyrosine which ligates and dissociates with DNA to promote break formation. One Spo11 protein is involved per strand of DNA, thus two Spo11 proteins are involved in each double stranded break event.

Genetic exchange between two DNA molecules by homologous recombination can begin with a break in both strands of DNA—called a double-strand break—and recombination is started by an endonuclease enzyme that cuts the DNA molecule that "receives" the exchanged DNA. In meiosis the enzyme is SPO11, which is related to DNA topoisomerases. Topoisomerases change DNA by transiently breaking one or both strands, passing the unbroken DNA strand or strands through the break and repairing the break; the broken ends of the DNA are covalently linked to topoisomerase. SPO11 is similarly attached to the DNA when it forms double-strand breaks during meiosis.

== Meiotic recombination ==
SPO11 is considered to play a predominant role in initiating meiotic recombination. However, recombination may also occur by alternative SPO11-independent mechanisms that can be studied experimentally using spo11 mutants.

In the budding yeast Saccharomyces cerevisiae, the meiotic defects in recombination and chromosome disjunction of spo11 mutants are alleviated by X-irradiation. This finding indicates that X-ray induced DNA damages can initiate crossover recombination leading to proper disjunction independently of SPO11.

In the worm Caenorhabditis elegans, a homolog of spo11 is ordinarily employed in the initiation of meiotic recombination. However, radiation induced-breaks can also initiate recombination in mutants deleted for this spo11 homolog.

Deamination of cytosine resulting in the dU:dG mismatch is one of the most common single-base-altering lesions in non-replicating DNA. Spo11 mutants of the fission yeast Schizosaccharomyces pombe and C. elegans undergo meiotic crossover recombination and proper chromosome segregation when dU:dG lesions are produced in their DNA. This crossover recombination does not involve the formation of large numbers of double-strand breaks, but does require uracil DNA-glycosylase, an enzyme that removes uracil from the DNA phosphodiester backbone and initiates base excision repair. Thus, it was proposed that base excision repair of DNA damage such as a uracil base, an abasic site, or a single-strand nick is sufficient to initiate meiotic crossover recombination in S. pombe and C. elegans.

In S. pombe, a mutant defective in the spo11 homolog Rec12 is deficient in meiotic recombination. However recombination can be restored to near normal levels by a deletion in rad2, a gene that encodes an endonuclease involved in Okazaki fragment processing (Farah et al., 2005). Both crossover and non-crossover recombination were increased but double-strand breaks were undetectable. On the basis of the biochemical properties of the rad2 deletion, it was proposed that meiotic recombination can be initiated by DNA lesions other than double-strand breaks, such as nicks and gaps which accumulate during premeiotic DNA replication when Okazaki fragment processing is deficient.

The above findings indicate that DNA damages arising from a variety of sources can be repaired by meiotic recombination and that such a process can occur independently of SPO11.

== Absence in some sexual species ==
The most recent common ancestor of the social amoeba genera Dictyostelium, Polysphondylium and Acytostelium, appears to have lacked the Spo11 gene. Such an ancestor likely lived several hundred million years ago. Dictyostelium discoideum and Polysphondylium pallidum are both capable of meiotic sexual reproduction (see D. discoideum sexual reproduction and P. pallidum sexual reproduction). Bloomfield speculated that dormant cells in the soil might be exposed to many kinds of stress, such as desiccation or radiation, that could induce spontaneous DNA damage. Such damage would make the induction of double-strand breaks by Spo11 redundant for the initiation of recombination during meiosis, and thus explain its absence in this group.
