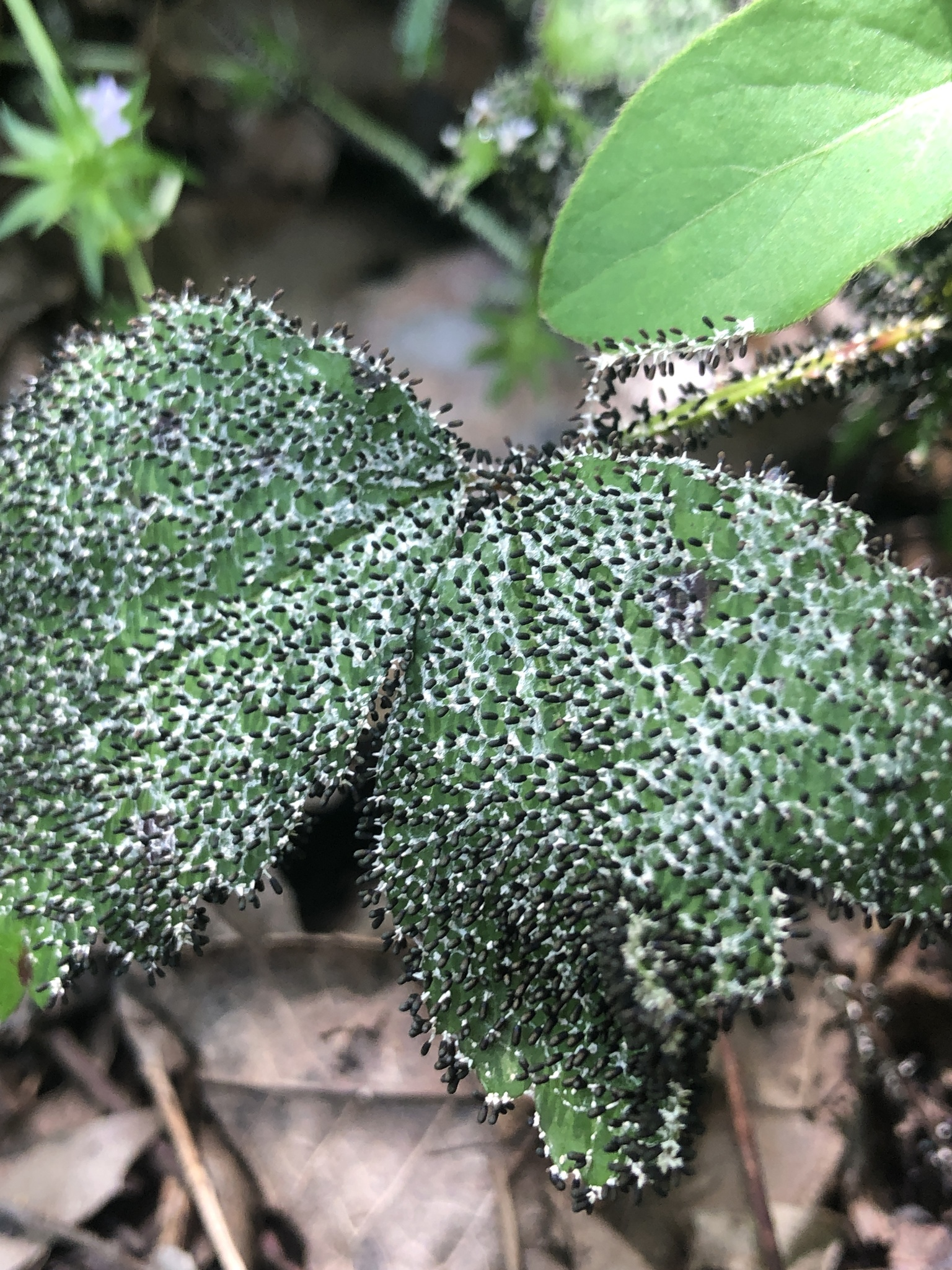
- Diachea leucopodia

Scientific classification
- Domain: Eukaryota
- Clade: Amorphea
- Phylum: Amoebozoa
- Class: Myxogastria
- Order: Stemonitidales
- Family: Stemonitidaceae
- Genus: Diachea; Fr.

Species
- See text

= Diachea =

Genus of slime molds

Diachea is a genus of slime molds belonging to the family Didymiaceae. The genus was first described in 1825 by Elias Magnus Fries.

The genus has a cosmopolitan distribution.

== Species ==
The genus includes the following species:

- Diachea bulbillosa
- Diachea leucopodia (Bull.) Rostaf. 1874
- Diachea splendens
- Diachea subsessilis
- Diachea thomasii
- Diachea verrucospora Nann.-Bremek. & Y.Yamam.
