= NIBAN3 =

Protein-coding gene in the species Homo sapiens

Identifiers
- Aliases: NIBAN3, BCNP1, family with sequence similarity 129 member C, niban apoptosis regulator 3, FAM129C
- External IDs: OMIM: 609967; MGI: 3686743; GeneCards: NIBAN3

Gene location (Human)
Chr.	Chromosome 19 (human)
Band	19p13.11	Start	17,523,301 bp
Band	19p13.11	End	17,553,839 bp

Gene location (Mouse)
Chr.	Chromosome 8 (mouse)
Band	8|8 B3.3	Start	71,597,648 bp
Band	8|8 B3.3	End	71,607,936 bp
RNA expression pattern
Bgee	Human / Mouse (ortholog); Top expressed in: spleen; granulocyte; lymph node; mucosa of ileum; appendix; blood; buccal mucosa cell; bone marrow; monocyte; gonad / Top expressed in: spleen; otic vesicle; mesenteric lymph nodes; granulocyte; blood; bone marrow; thymus; zygote; embryo; secondary oocyte; More reference expression data
BioGPS	n/a
Orthologs
Databases	NCBI: entry; OMA: entry
Species	Human	Mouse
Entrez	199786	100037278
Ensembl	ENSG00000167483	ENSMUSG00000043243
UniProt	Q86XR2	n/a
RefSeq (mRNA)	NM_001098524; NM_173544; NM_001321826; NM_001321827; NM_001321828 NM_001363609	NM_001166213; NM_001384129
RefSeq (protein)	NP_001091994; NP_001308755; NP_001308756; NP_001308757; NP_775815 NP_001350538	n/a
Location (UCSC)	Chr 19: 17.52 – 17.55 Mb	Chr 8: 71.6 – 71.61 Mb
PubMed search
- Wikidata
View/Edit Human	View/Edit Mouse

Protein Niban 3 is a protein that in humans is encoded by the gene NIBAN3 (previously FAM129C). Not much has been reported about the function of this protein, but it has been found expressed in B-Cells. It has also been called Niban-like protein 2. Paralogs of this gene include NIBAN1 and NIBAN2.

== Gene ==
FAM129C gene location on chromosome 19, genomic context

The FAM129C gene is 30,538 base pairs long and is mapped to 19p.13.112 on chromosome 19 (NC_000019.10) from 17523301 to 17553839 in humans. Chromosome 19 has highest gene density of all human chromosomes and large clustered gene families corresponding to high G + C content, CpG islands, and high-density repetitive DNA suggest evolutionary significance for genes located here. Based on location and expression of FAM129C gene, this would suggest it has a role in immune system function.

== Gene conservation ==
True orthologs of FAM129C seem to be highly conserved in mammals, reptiles, marsupials, bony and cartilaginous fish. The most distant ortholog of FAM129C were found to be in a cellular slime mould, Polysphondyllum pallidum, and even a species of barley, Hordeum vulgare.

Species	Common name	NCBI Accession #	Sequence length	E value
Homo sapiens	Human	AAI67806	697	–––––––
Polysphondyllum pallidum	Cellular slime mould	ADBJ01000008.1	532	1.00E-05
Hordeum vulgare	Barley	AK366539.1	553	2.00E-04

== Gene expression ==
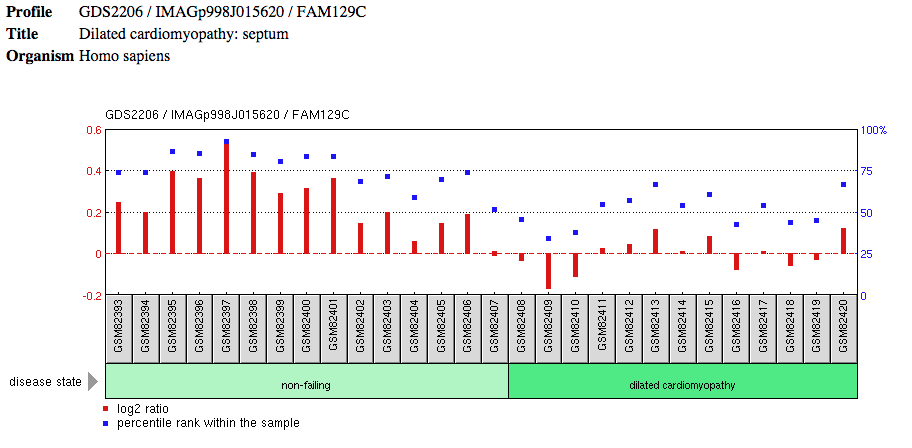
FAM129C expression in dilated cardiomyopathy tissue

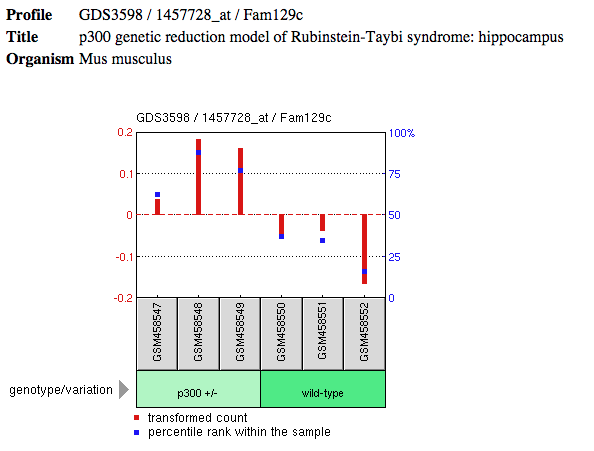
p300 genetic reduction model of Rubinstein-Taybi syndrome: hippocampus

In normal tissues, the highest expression was in lymph, bone marrow, and spleen tissue, with low expression in other parts of the human body. FAM129C contains pleckstrin homology domain that may cause the protein to associate with the plasma membrane. It is expressed in early stages of B-cell differentiation, and in high levels in chronic lymphocytic leukemia, and in the activated subtype of diffuse large B-cell lymphoma. FAM129C is mainly expressed in the cytoplasm. The pattern of expression is similar to that of CXCR4, so may be involved in B cell development and B cell maturation during germinal center reaction.

In the human GEO profile, FAM129C appears to be expressed at lower levels in tissues with dilated cardiomyopathy by almost 50% when compared to non-failing septum tissue. This may mean that FAM129C plays a role in non-failing heart tissue. Another condition in which FAM129C is significantly down-regulated is with the wild-type genotype hippocampal tissue of Rubinstein-Taybi compared with the p300 +/- genotype. People with this condition have an increased risk of developing noncancerous and cancerous tumors such as leukemia and lymphoma

== Protein ==
The isoelectric point of NLP2 is 8.576000. The molecular weight is 77.4 kdal. The amino acid sequence is 697aa long

=== Structure ===
The predicted tertiary structure for NLP2 shows the FAM129C PH domain. There are seven predicted β sheets at the N terminus. This will form the tertiary structure of the pleckstrin homology domain.

== Protein post-modification ==
Transmembrane domains, peptide cleavage sites, or strong glycosylation sites were not predicted for NLP2. A total of 32 likely phosphorylation sites were predicted on Serine (25,) Threonine (5), and Tyrosine (2).
