= Toshiyuki Nakagaki =

Japanese biologist

Toshiyuki Nakagaki (born 1963) is a Japanese professor, biologist, ethologist at the Research Institute of Electronic Science (RIES). He is famous for leading experiments relating to slime mold, specifically its ability to solve mazes as a lifeform without a brain.

== Biography ==
Toshiyuki Nakagaki was born in 1963 in Aichi Prefecture, Japan. He has shown an interest in art and animals, particularly the morphology and motion of animals.

He was a student at the Graduate School of Life Science where he majored in Soft matter. He later completed a master’s program in Nagoya University, after which he became a professor in Hokkaido University.

== Research ==
=== Slime molds ===
Toshiyuki Nakagaki is well known for his work with slime mold or Physarum polycephalum. He researched the behavioral intelligence of protists and how they are able to memorize mazes. It is proposed as a solution to the Steiner tree problem to figure out the shortest path between two points. Additionally, they have been shown to anticipate environmental changes and respond to less favorable conditions. This experiment not only had effects in biology, figuring out a way in which a brainless organism seems to make decisions, but it affects philosophy by changing the understanding of intelligence.

Using this research, Toshiyuki Nakagaki placed a slime mold in a recreation of Tokyo. The slime mimicked the Tokyo railway system without any prior knowledge of the railway. Nakagaki argues that any differences between the two are the result of human politics and that the slime mold may have made the railway more efficient.

Additionally, Nakagaki has been doing research into making robots based on these slime molds. These robots would have two primary parts, the fluid circuit and a deformable body, which would allow it to achieve a wide variety of tasks. The biggest issue with this robot is that it is difficult to control a fully deformable body. A possible solution would be to implement degrees of freedom, which would limit the robot, but allow it to be usable.

=== Other research ===
Although less so than his amoeba research, Tashiyuki Nakagaki about Scolopocryptops rubiginosus. This centipede was studied as it does not follow the usual gait of limbless and many-legged invertebrates where instead of an eel-like slithering, that its gait switched in response to irregular terrain rather than stride frequency.

== Ig Nobel Prize ==
In 2008, Toshiyuki Nakagaki received the Ig Nobel Prize in Cognitive Science along with Hiroyasu Yamada, Ryo Kobayashi, Atsushi Tero, Akio Ishiguro, and Ágota Tóth. They discovered that slime molds could be used to solve mazes in the quickest way possible.

In 2010, Toshiyuki Nakagaki received the Ig Nobel Prize again; this time in Transportation Planning with Atsushi Tero, Seiji Takagi, Tetsu Saigusa, Kentaro Ito, Kenji Yumiki, Ryo Kobayashi, Dan Bebber, and Mark Fricker. They received this Ig Nobel Prize by using slime molds to find optimal routes for railroad tracks.

Toshiyuki Nakagaki is one of only 9 people to have received multiple Ig Nobel Prizes.

== Other events ==
In 2015, Toshiyuki Nakagaki gave a Ted Talks with its program, TEDx Sapporo. In this event he spoke of how slime molds are unique.
