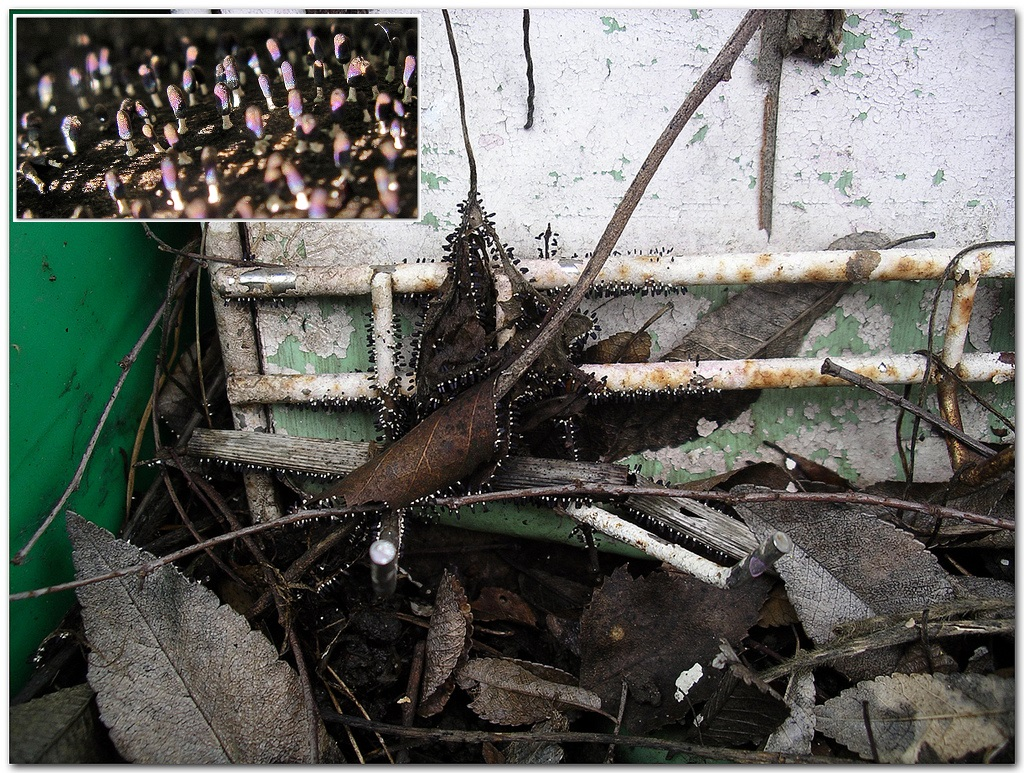

Scientific classification
- Domain: Eukaryota
- Phylum: Amoebozoa
- Class: Myxogastria
- Order: Stemonitidales
- Family: Stemonitidaceae
- Genus: Diachea
- Species: D. leucopodia

Binomial name
- Diachea leucopodia (Bull.) Rostaf.

= Diachea leucopodia =

Species of slime mould

Diachea leucopodia is a species of slime mold of the family Didymiaceae. It is characterized by black or dark-brown spores, as well as an iridescent peridium, which occurs in younger species and does not always persist into maturity. Diachea leucopodia are often found on, in some reports, plant matter, strawberries, and surrounding inorganic matter.
