= Atsushi Tero =

Japanese biologist

Atsushi Tero is a researcher, biologist, and associate professor of applied mathematics at Kyushu University. He is known for his research of slime molds, their ability to solve mazes and their practical uses.

== Research ==
Atsushi Tero has led research on slime molds, specifically Physarum polycephalum. With Toshiyuki Nakagaki and other researchers, he researched slime molds and their ability to solve mazes and even memorize mazes. It was proposed as a solution to the Steiner tree problem as the shortest way to connect two points. This affects biology and philosophy because a brainless organism seemed to be making decisions to solve the maze. Additionally, the researchers were able to deduce that these slime molds respond to environmental changes.

In 2009, he used slime molds to simulate Tokyo’s railway system. The study shows that the slime molds may have found a more efficient path than the path that is used.

== The Ig Nobel Prize ==
Atsushi Tero won the Ig Nobel Prize along with Toshiyuki Nakagaki, Hiroyasu Yamada, Ryo Kobayashi, Akio Ishiguro, and Ágota Tóth in Cognitive Science in 2008. They received this prize with the discovery of slime molds being able to solve mazes.

Atsushi Tero won the Ig Nobel Prize with Toshiyuki Nakagaki, Seiji Takagi, Tetsu Saigusa, Kentaro Ito, Kenji Yumiki, Ryo Kobayashi, Dan Bebber, and Mark Fricker in Transportation Planning in 2010. They received this prize for using slime molds to depict Tokyo’s railway system in possibly a more efficient way.

He is one of nine people to have won multiple Ig Nobel Prizes.
