= Slime Mold of the Year in Latvia =

Slime Mold of the Year in Latvia is an annual award for a slime mold species of the Latvian slime mold diversity, specifically in the Myxomycetes group.

The selection is supervised by the Latvian Mycological Society [lv]. In 2026, one of the seven slime mold nominees was selected by contributors to the Facebook group, "For slime mold admirers and researchers" (lv. Gļotsēņu apbrīnotājiem un pētniekiem).

The Myxomycetes category is a relatively novel one – the nomination has been held since 2023."

== Selected slime mold (Myxomycetes) species by year ==
- 2026 – Badhamia utricularis
- 2025 – Pretzel slime mold (Hemitrichia serpula)
- 2024 – Insect-egg slime mold (Leocarpus fragilis)
- 2023 – Stemonitis axifera
