= Acrasin =

Slime mold aggregation phermones

An acrasin is a pheromone used by species of slime mold, which signals to the many individual cells and triggers an aggregation response, such that they form a single large cell (a plasmodium). One of the earliest acrasins to be identified was cyclic AMP, found in the species Dictyostelium discoideum by Brian Shaffer, which exhibits a complex swirling-pulsating spiral pattern when forming a pseudoplasmodium.

The term "acrasin" is a reference to the character Acrasia in Edmund Spenser's Faerie Queene, who seduced men against their will and then transformed them into beasts. Acrasia is itself a play on the Greek akrasia that describes loss of free will.

== Extraction ==
Brian Shaffer was the first to purify acrasin, now known to be cyclic AMP, in 1954, using methanol. Glorin, the acrasin of Polysphondylium violaceum, can be purified by inhibiting the acrasin-degrading enzyme acrasinase with alcohol, extracting with alcohol and separating with column chromatography.

== Notes ==
1. Evidence for the formation of cell aggregates by chemotaxis in the development of the slime mold Dictyostelium discoideum - J.T.Bonner and L.J.Savage Journal of Experimental Biology Vol. 106, pp. 1, October (1947) Cell Biology
2. Aggregation in cellular slime moulds: in vitro isolation of acrasin - B.M.Shaffer Nature Vol. 79, pp. 975, (1953) Cell Biology
3. Identification of a pterin as the acrasin of the cellular slime mold Dictyostelium lacteum - Proceedings of the National Academy of Sciences United States Vol. 79, pp. 6270–6274, October (1982) Cell Biology
4. Hunting Slime Moulds - Adele Conover, Smithsonian Magazine Online (2001)
