= NIBAN1 =

Protein-coding gene in humans

Identifiers
- Aliases: NIBAN1, C1orf24, NIBAN, GIG39, family with sequence similarity 129 member A, niban apoptosis regulator 1, FAM129A
- External IDs: MGI: 2137237; GeneCards: NIBAN1

Gene location (Human)
Chr.	Chromosome 1 (human)
Band	1q25.3	Start	184,790,724 bp
Band	1q25.3	End	184,974,508 bp

Gene location (Mouse)
Chr.	Chromosome 1 (mouse)
Band	1|1 G1- G2	Start	151,446,937 bp
Band	1|1 G1- G2	End	151,597,690 bp
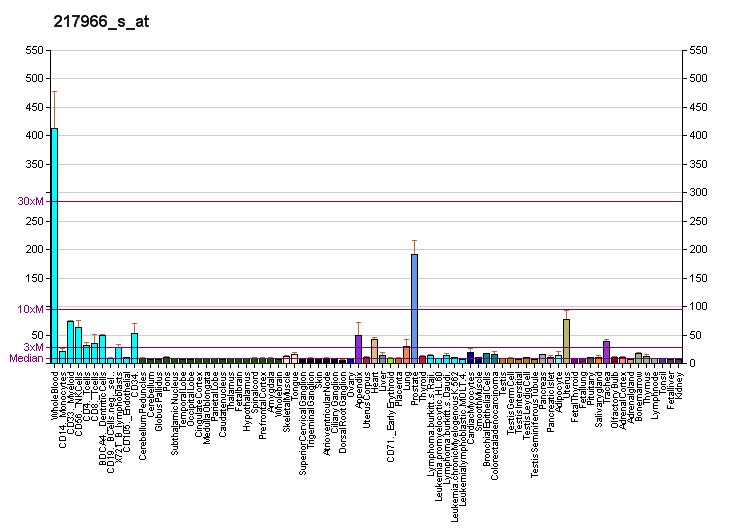

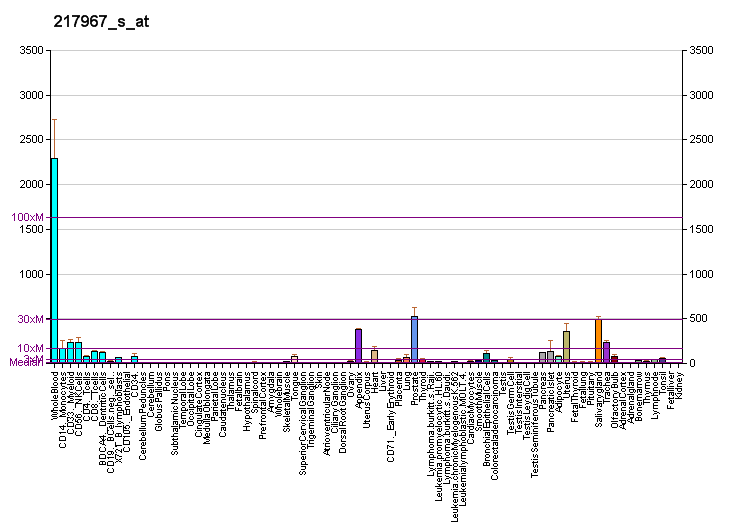
RNA expression pattern
Bgee	Human / Mouse (ortholog); Top expressed in: saphenous vein; parotid gland; right ventricle; vena cava; myocardium; cardiac muscle tissue of right atrium; myocardium of left ventricle; Skeletal muscle tissue of rectus abdominis; seminal vesicula; right coronary artery / Top expressed in: iris; ciliary body; granulocyte; calvaria; ascending aorta; ankle; lumbar spinal ganglion; aortic valve; conjunctival fornix; lacrimal gland; More reference expression data
BioGPS	More reference expression data
Gene ontology
Molecular function	protein binding; molecular function
Cellular component	cytoplasm; plasma membrane; extracellular exosome; membrane; cytosol
Biological process	negative regulation of protein phosphorylation; positive regulation of protein phosphorylation; regulation of translation; positive regulation of translation; response to endoplasmic reticulum stress
Sources:Amigo / QuickGO
Orthologs
Databases	NCBI: entry; OMA: entry
Species	Human	Mouse
Entrez	116496	63913
Ensembl	ENSG00000135842	ENSMUSG00000026483
UniProt	Q9BZQ8	Q3UW53
RefSeq (mRNA)	NM_052966	NM_022018
RefSeq (protein)	NP_443198	NP_071301
Location (UCSC)	Chr 1: 184.79 – 184.97 Mb	Chr 1: 151.45 – 151.6 Mb
PubMed search
- Wikidata
View/Edit Human	View/Edit Mouse

Protein Niban 1 is a protein that in humans is encoded by the NIBAN1 gene. Paralogs of this protein include NIBAN2, and NIBAN3.
