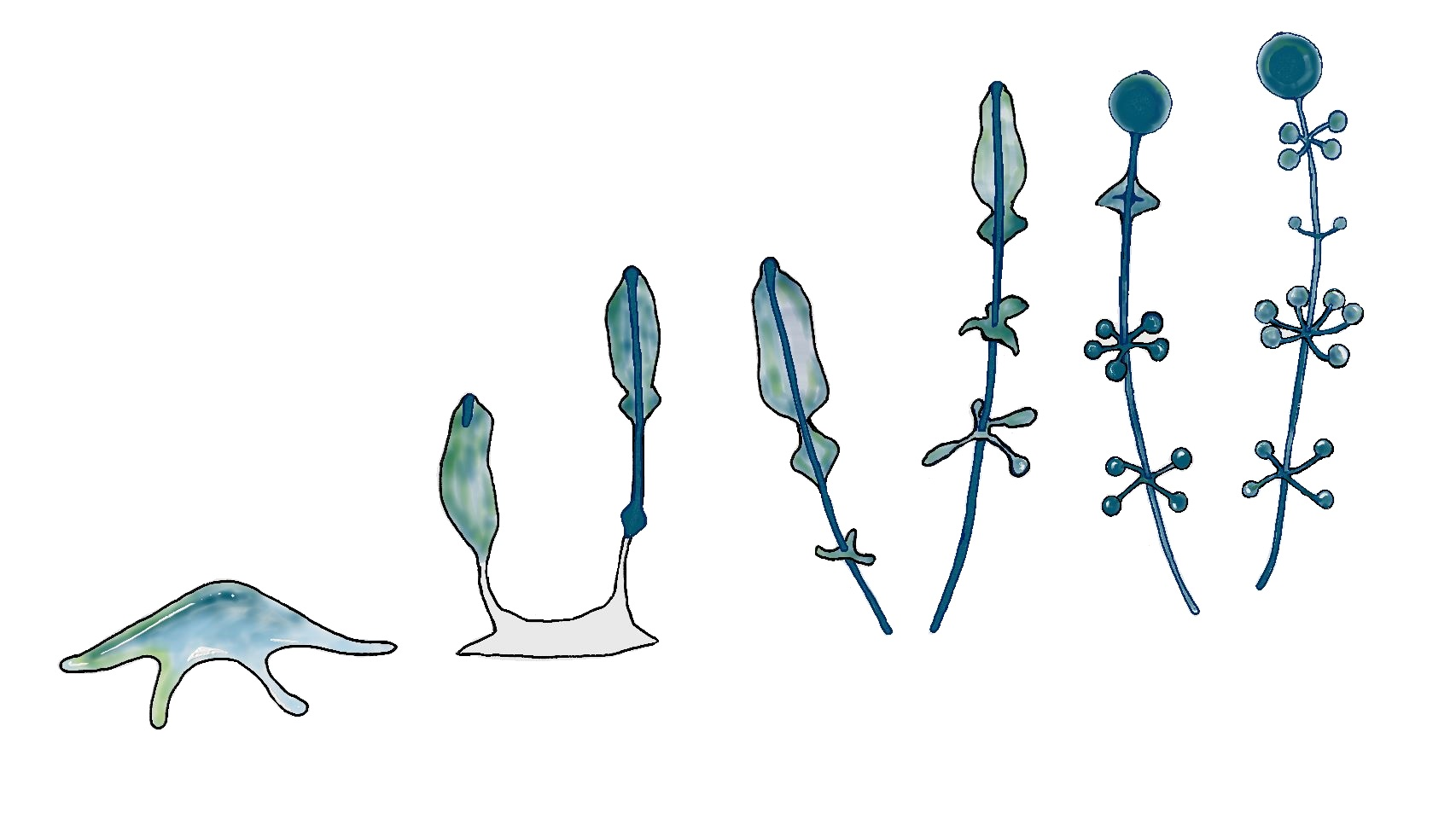

Scientific classification
- Domain: Eukaryota
- Phylum: Amoebozoa
- Class: Dictyostelia
- Order: Dictyosteliida
- Family: Dictyosteliidae
- Genus: Polysphondylium
- Species: P. pallidum

Binomial name
- Polysphondylium pallidum Olive (1901)

= Polysphondylium pallidum =

Species of slime mould

Polysphondylium pallidum is a species of cellular slime mould, a member of the phylum Mycetozoa.

== Taxonomy ==
The lectotype of Polysphondylium pallidum was first described from Liberia where it was growing on the dung of an ass. This slime mould has a world-wide distribution but there has been found to be variation between different samples and in a taxonomic revision in 2008, Kawakami and Hagiwara determined that some specimens originally described as P. pallidum were a different species, Polysphondylium album.

== Biology ==
Polysphondylium pallidum starts life as a single-celled amoeboid protist. Like other slime moulds, it lives in soil, dung, leaf litter and other decaying organic materials. It is known as a myxamoeba and feeds on bacteria and fungal spores. In favourable, damp conditions it may reproduce sexually while in drier conditions, asexual reproduction is more likely. The myxamoebae release a chemical agent, acrasin, which guides other slime mould cells to move towards them.

== Sexual reproduction ==
The myxoedemae of Polysphondylium pallidum were found to exist in two separate mating types in an early (1975) study on the species, but a more recent morphological study left the question of the number of identifiable and separate mating types undecided. Under favourable damp conditions, a haploid cell with a single set of chromosomes will unite with another cell of opposite mating type to form a diploid cell, with a double complement of chromosomes. Other nearby amoeboid cells are absorbed into this diploid cell by phagocytosis to form a giant cell. This undergoes meiosis and becomes a large cyst in which spores are formed and later released to be dispersed by air movements.

== Asexual reproduction ==
In damp weather, a Polysphondylium pallidum myxamoeba can move around at a speed of about 1 millimetre (0.04 in) per hour, leaving a chemical trail behind it. When it finds the trail left by another myxamoeba, it follows it, superimposing its own trace signal, and more and more individuals collect together in this way. Under favourable conditions, the myxamoebae agglutinate and stick together to form a "pseudoplasmodium" in which they remain separate individuals but behave as if the whole mass was a single organism. The pseudoplasmodium can move around and in due course develops into a fruiting body called a sporangium, about a third of the cells forming a stalk and the remaining cells forming a ball at the top where they develop into spores. The spores have a smooth wall containing cellulose, a material not found among fungi which have cell walls strengthened by chitin. As the ball dries out, the spores are dispersed by the wind. The myxamoebae that form the supporting stem die, having sacrificed themselves for the greater good.

== Research ==
Slime moulds are of interest to developmental biologists because they represent a link between single-celled organisms and multi-celled organisms. In an experiment to study the conditions necessary for agglutination, Polysphondylium pallidum was cultured on plates of hay-infusion agar. A thin surface layer of Escherichia coli was added, created by allowing a drop of suspension to spread out over the surface of the non-nutrient agar to form a layer of even thickness. The myxamoebae were inoculated centrally on the plate. The culture was then incubated under different conditions of light and darkness and it was found that agglutination was greatly increased by exposure to light. Even one minute of illumination soon after incubation had started was sufficient to trigger multiple centres of agglutination. One minute of exposure at a later stage was less effective. Although light was involved in agglutination, the introduction of some light exposed myxamoebae did not cause dark-only cells to clump. Other possible stimuli were tried but mostly had negative responses; heat was ineffective; CO_{2} had little effect but reduced clumping in light treated cells; potassium hydroxide had little effect; charcoal increased the number of clumps in light treated cells and caused a slight increase in number of dark cells that agglutinated; mineral oil has similar effects to charcoal in light treated cells but a more marked effect in the dark cells where the resulting aggregations nearly reached that found in light treated cultures. The conclusions drawn from these experiments were that some form of suppressor may accumulate in the vicinity of the myxamoebae preventing them from agglutinating. Light exposure encouraged agglutination before much suppressor was present. Charcoal and mineral oil increased agglutination by absorbing the suppressor.
