= Slime mold =

Spore-forming organisms

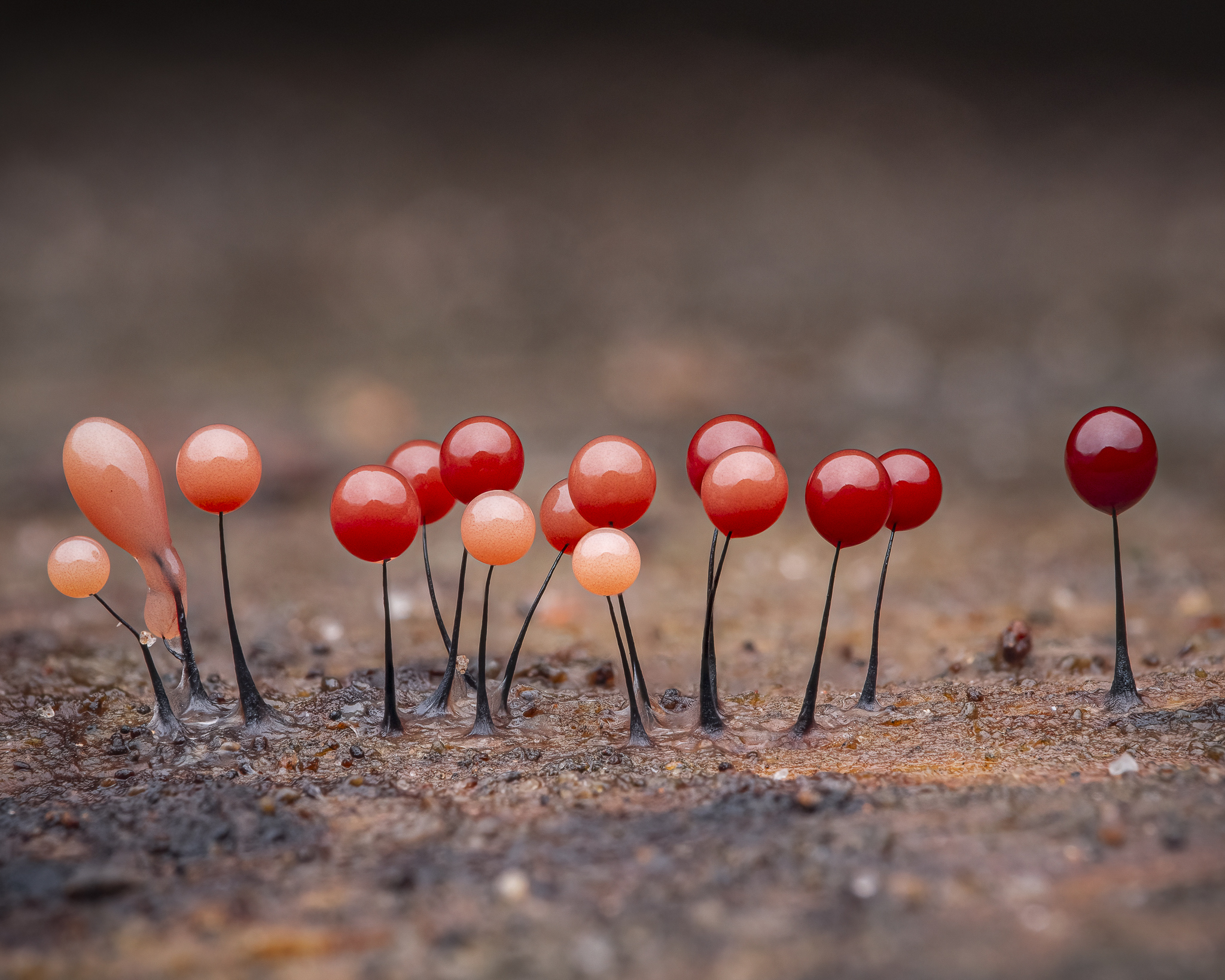
Comatricha nigra (Myxogastria) with developing fruiting bodies (sporangia)

Slime molds (British English: Slime moulds) are a variety of small or microscopic organisms in different groups. They have both single-celled and multicellular forms during their life cycle, the individual cells coming together to form fruiting bodies that produce spores. Most live in damp places such as rotting wood.

More formally, the slime molds are a polyphyletic assemblage of distantly related eukaryotic organisms in the Stramenopiles, Rhizaria, Discoba, Amoebozoa and Holomycota clades. Most are near-microscopic; those in the Myxogastria form larger plasmodial slime molds visible to the naked eye. Spores are often produced in macroscopic multicellular or multinucleate fruiting bodies formed through aggregation or fusion; aggregation is driven by chemical signals called acrasins. Slime molds contribute to the decomposition of dead vegetation; some are parasitic.

Most slime molds are terrestrial and free-living, typically in damp shady habitats. Eumycetozoa flourish in swamp forests. Some myxogastrians and protostelians are aquatic or semi-aquatic. The phytomyxea are parasitic, living inside their plant hosts. Geographically, slime molds are cosmopolitan in distribution. A small number of species occur in regions as dry as the Atacama Desert and as cold as the Arctic; they are abundant in the tropics, especially in rainforests. Slime molds have a variety of behaviors otherwise seen in animals with brains. Species such as Physarum polycephalum have been used to simulate traffic networks. Some species have traditionally been eaten by humans in countries such as Ecuador.

== Evolution ==
=== Taxonomic history ===
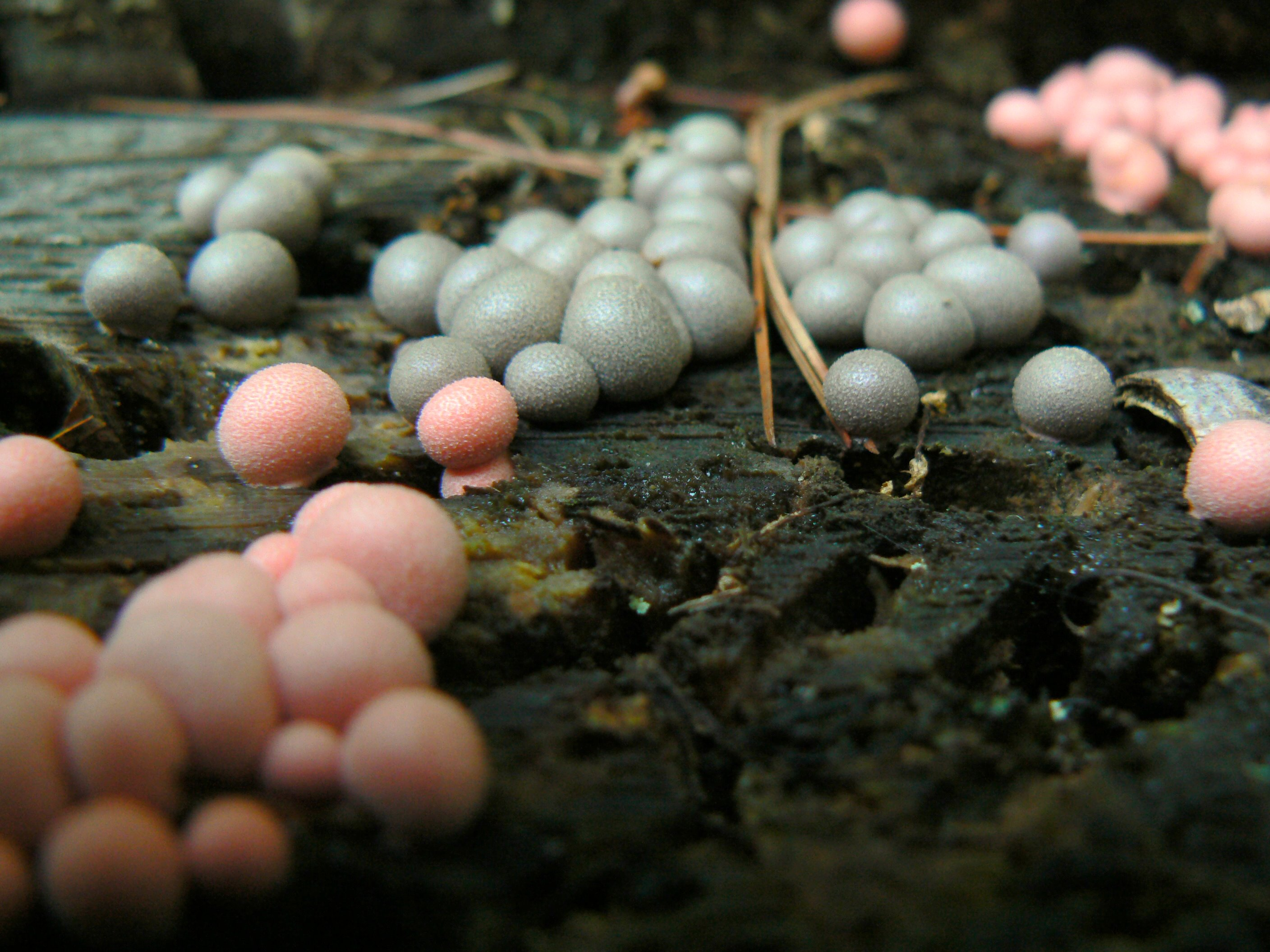
Lycogala epidendrum was the first slime mold to be discussed scientifically, by Thomas Panckow in 1654.

The first account of a slime mold was Thomas Panckow's 1654 discussion of Lycogala epidendrum. He called it Fungus cito crescentes, "a fast-growing fungus".

German mycologist Heinrich Anton de Bary, in 1860 and 1887, classified the Myxomycetes (plasmodial slime molds) and Acrasieae (cellular slime molds) as Mycetozoa, a new class. He also introduced a "Doubtful Mycetozoa" section for Plasmodiophora (now in Phytomyxea) and Labyrinthula, emphasizing their distinction from plants and fungi. In 1880, the French botanist Philippe van Tieghem analyzed the two groups further.

In 1868, the German biologist Ernst Haeckel placed the Mycetozoa in a kingdom he named Protista. In 1885, the British zoologist Ray Lankester grouped the Mycetozoa alongside the Proteomyxa as part of the Gymnomyxa in the phylum Protozoa. Arthur and Gulielma Lister published monographs of the group in 1894, 1911, and 1925.

In 1932 and 1960, the American mycologist George Willard Martin argued that the slime molds evolved from fungi. In 1956, the American biologist Herbert Copeland placed the Mycetozoa (the myxomycetes and plasmodiophorids) and the Sarkodina (the labyrinthulids and the cellular slime molds) in a phylum called Protoplasta, which he placed alongside the fungi and the algae in a new kingdom, Protoctista.

In 1969, the taxonomist R. H. Whittaker observed that slime molds were highly conspicuous and distinct within the Fungi, the group to which they were then classified. He concurred with Lindsay S. Olive's proposal to reclassify the Gymnomycota, which includes slime molds, as part of the Protista. Whittaker placed three phyla, namely the Myxomycota, Acrasiomycota, and Labyrinthulomycota in a subkingdom Gymnomycota within the Fungi. The same year, Martin and Alexopoulos published their influential textbook The Myxomycetes.

In 1975, Olive distinguished the dictyostelids and the acrasids as separate groups. In 1992, David J. Patterson and M. L. Sogin proposed that the dictyostelids diverged before plants, animals, and fungi.

=== Phylogeny ===
Slime molds have little or no fossil history, as might be expected given that they are small and soft-bodied. The grouping is polyphyletic, consisting of multiple clades (emphasised in the phylogenetic tree) widely scattered across the Eukaryotes, as described by Vallverdú 2018 and others. The phylogeny of the Eumycetozoa or "true slime molds" is based on Tekle et al 2022.

- Eukaryotes
  - Diphoda
    - Diaphoretickes
      - - Plants
        - SAR
          - Stramenopiles
            - Labyrinthulomycetes
          - Rhizaria
            - Phytomyxea
    - Discoba
      - euglenae, etc
      - Acrasida
  - Amorphea
    - Amoebozoa amoebae
      - other groups
      - Eumycetozoa "true slime molds"
        - Dictyostelia
        - - Myxogastria
          - Protosporangiida
    - Opisthokonta
      - Holomycota
        - Fonticulida
        - Fungi
      - Animals

== Diversity ==
Various estimates of the number of species of slime molds agree that there are around 1000 species, most being Myxogastria. Collection of environmental DNA gives a higher estimate, from 1200 to 1500 species. These are diverse both taxonomically and in appearance, the largest and most familiar species being among the Myxogastria. The growth forms most commonly noticed are the sporangia, the spore-forming bodies, which are often roughly spherical; these may be directly on the surface, such as on rotting wood, or may be on a thin stalk which elevates the spores for release above the surface. Other species have the spores in a large mass, which may be visited by insects for food; they disperse spores when they leave.

=== Macroscopic, plasmodial slime molds: Myxogastria ===
The Myxogastria or plasmodial slime molds are the only macroscopic scale slime molds; they gave the group its informal name, since for part of their life cycle they are slimy to the touch. A myxogastrian consists of a large cell with thousands of nuclei within a single membrane without walls, forming a syncytium. Most are smaller than a few centimeters, but some species may reach sizes up to several square meters, and in the case of Brefeldia maxima, a mass of up to 20 kilograms (44 lb).

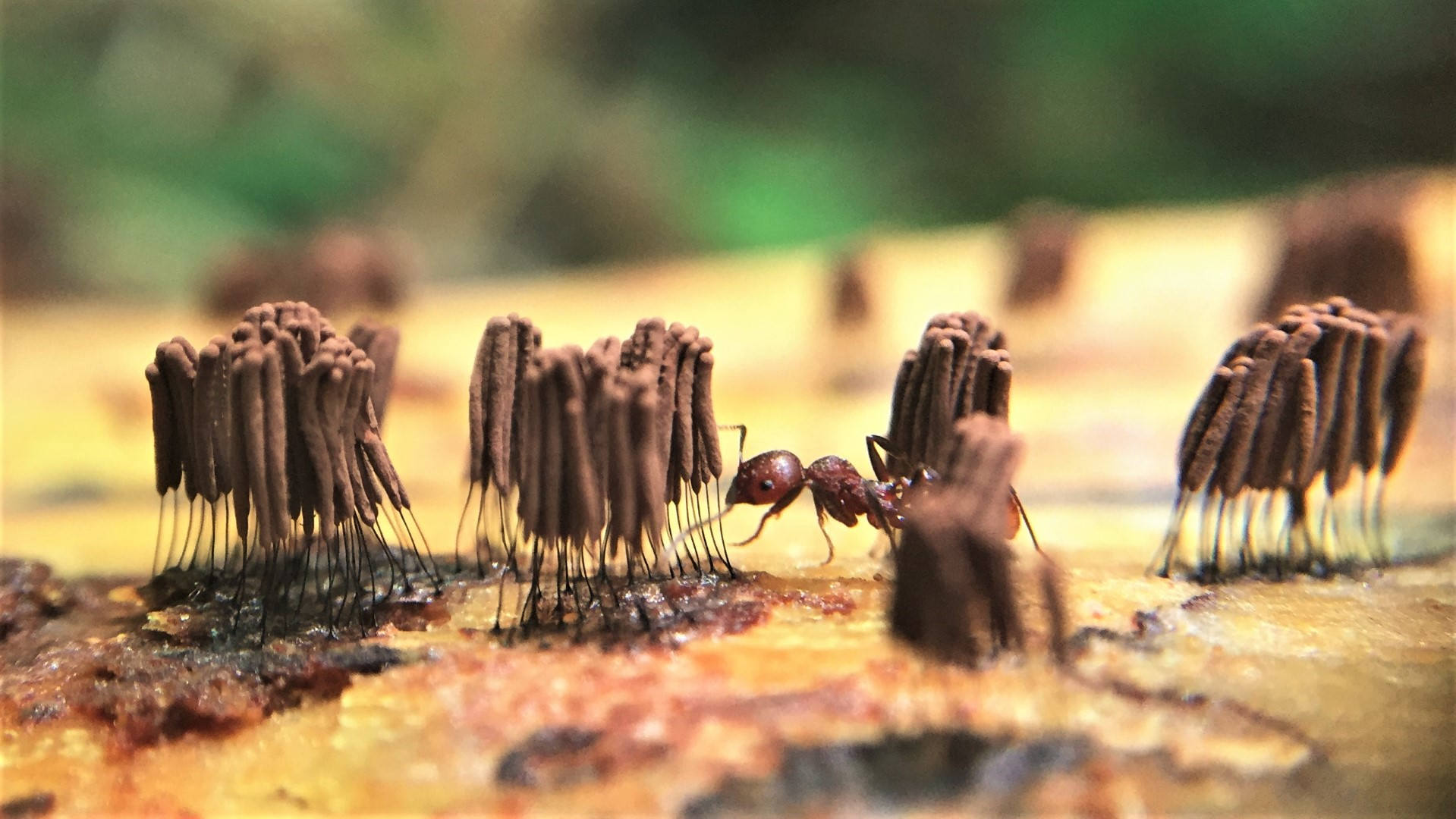
Stemonitis shows stalked sporangia for airborne spore dispersal.

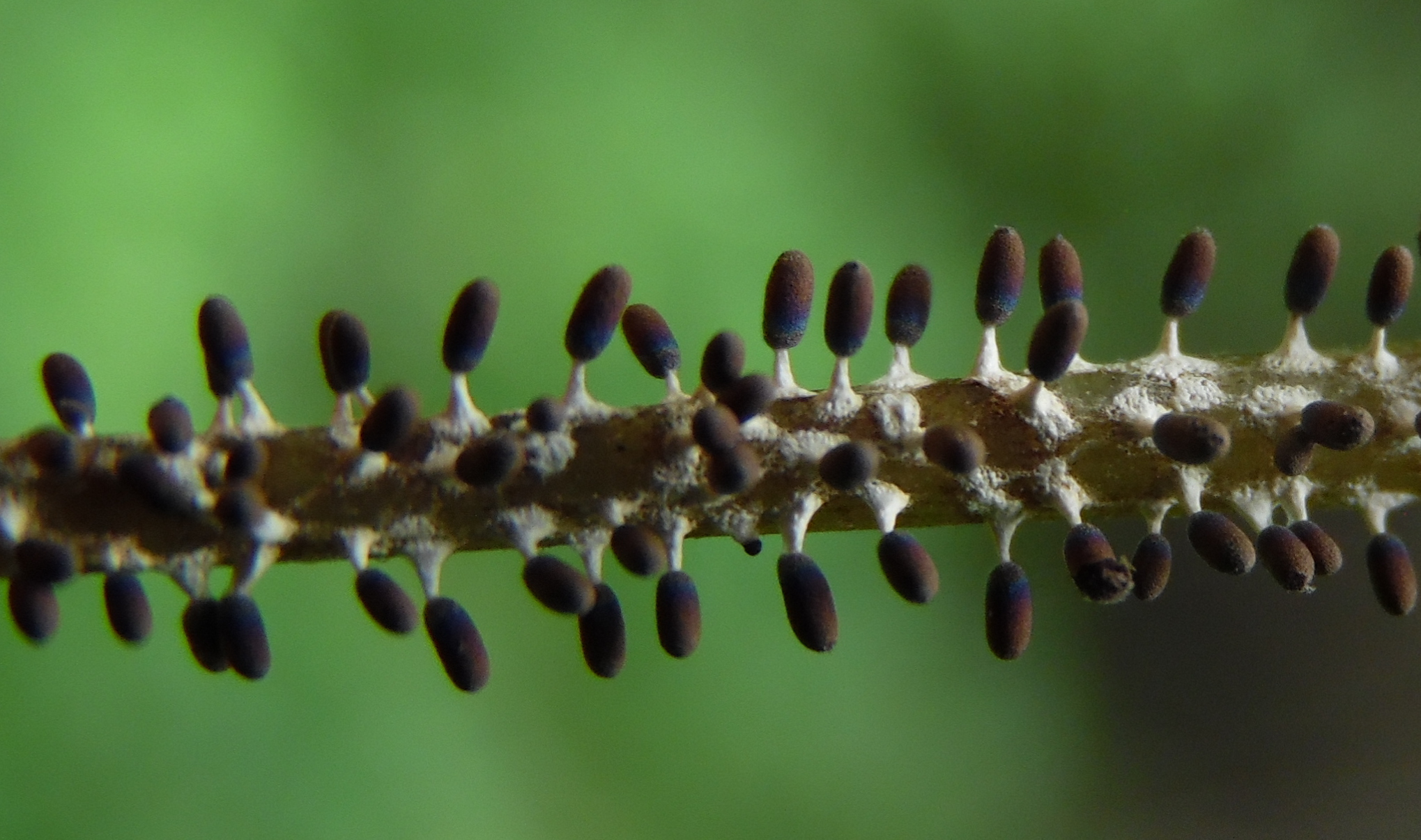
Diachea leucopodia

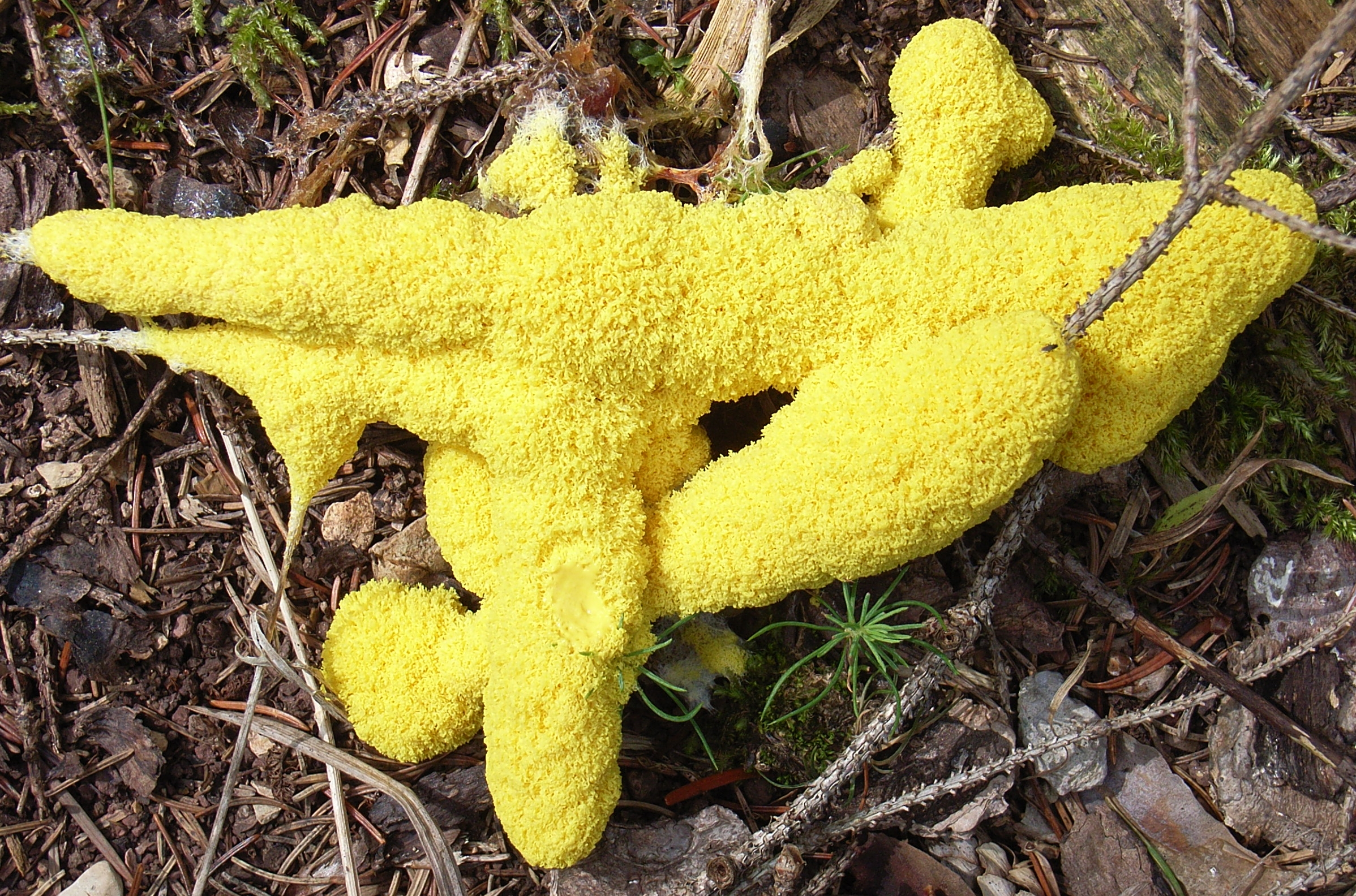
Fuligo septica cells aggregate to form a soft mass.

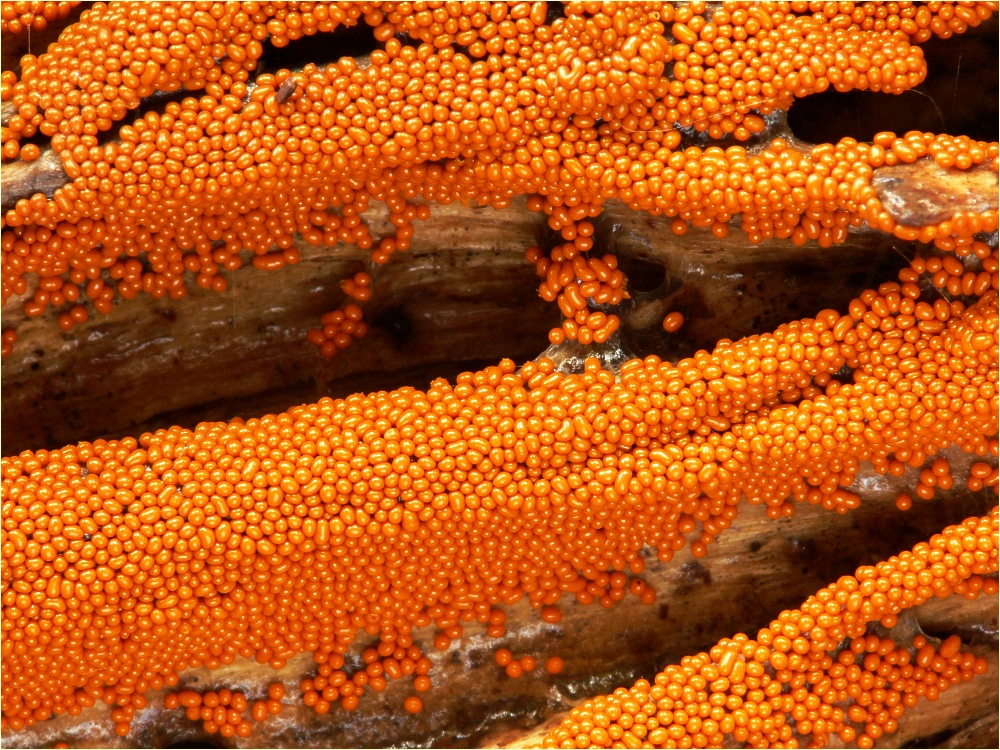
Trichia varia

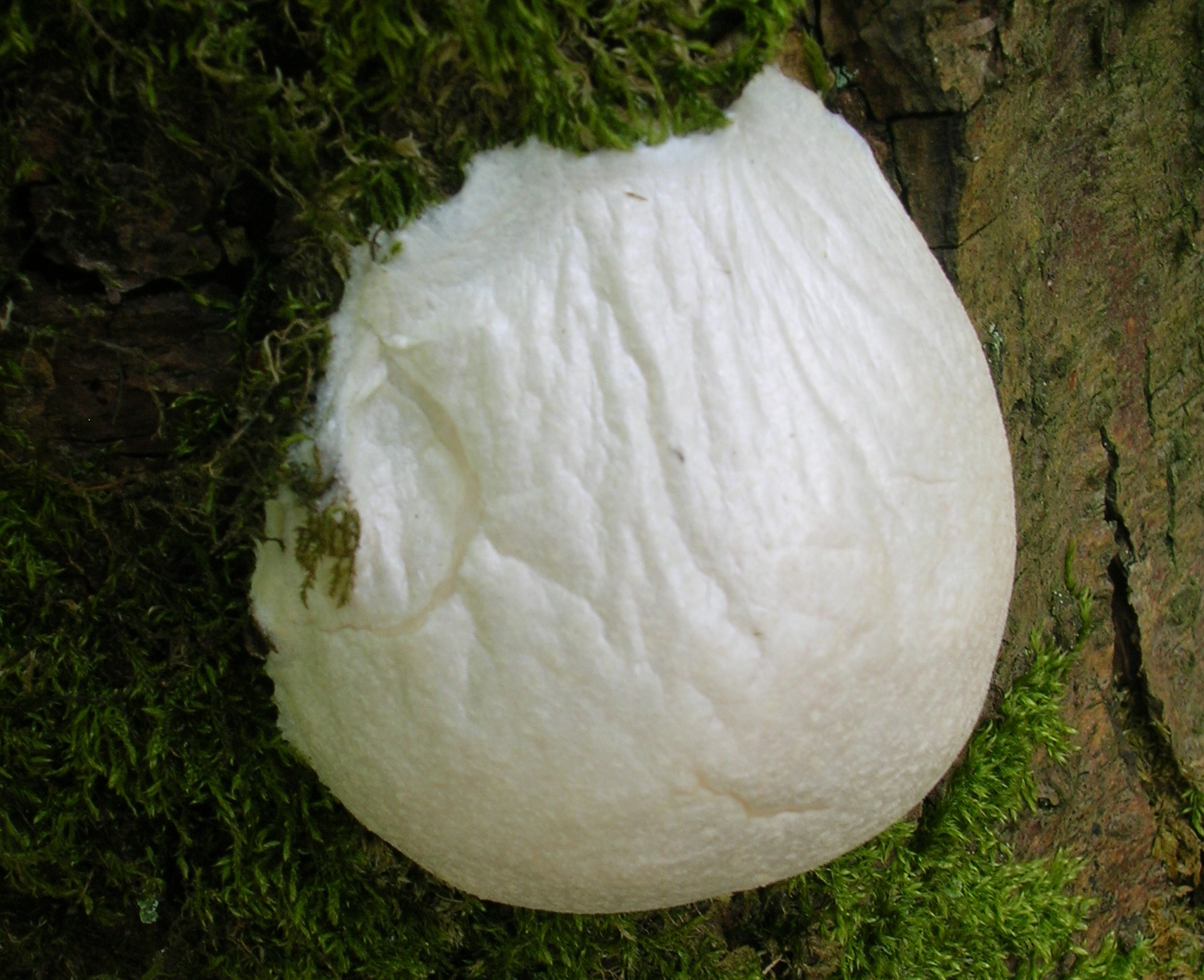
Enteridium lycoperdon sporangium. Spores can disperse in air or water, or by slime mold flies.

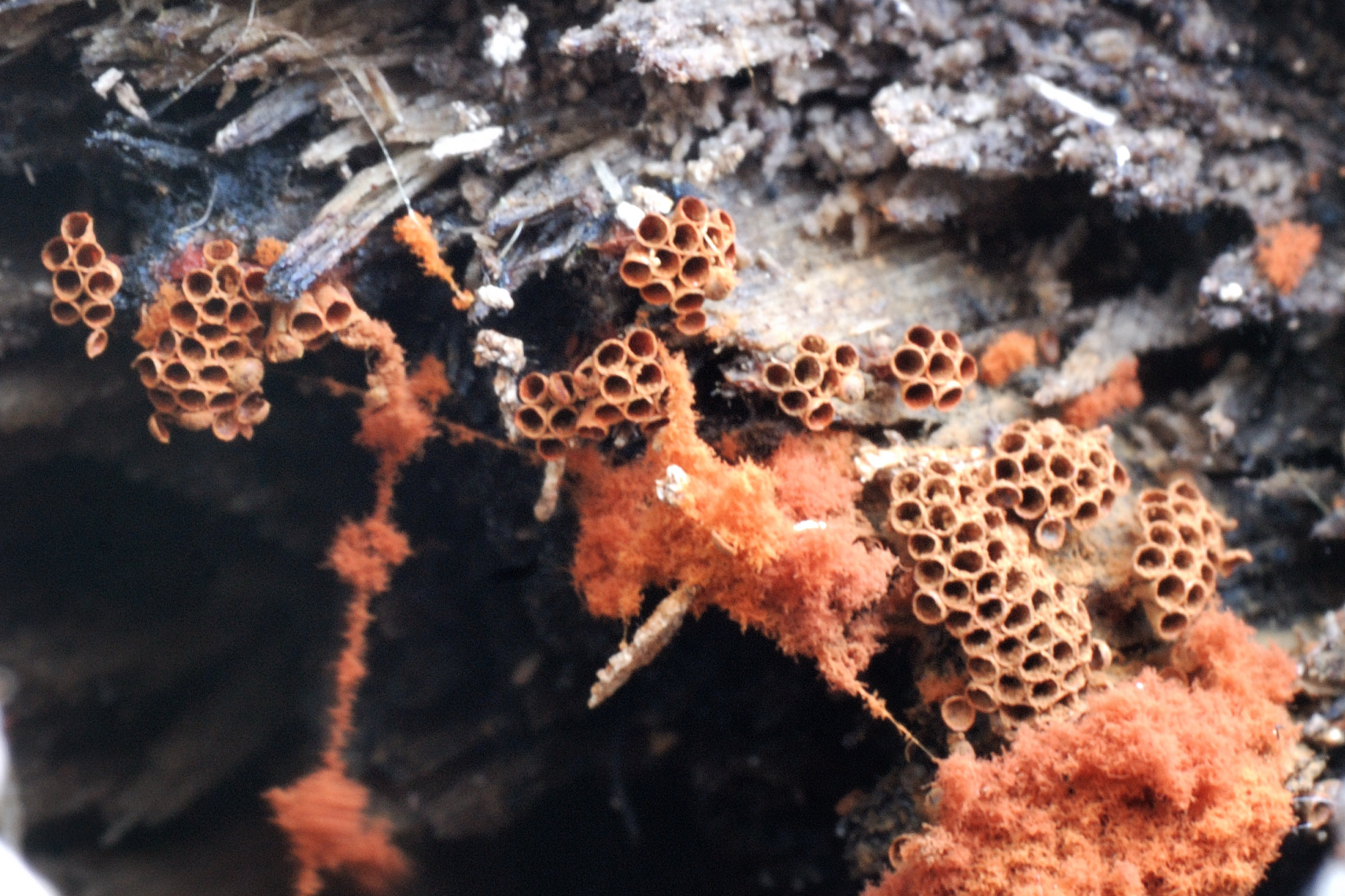
Metatrichia vesparium has small round sporangia that have spiral elaters to eject their lids and disperse their spores.

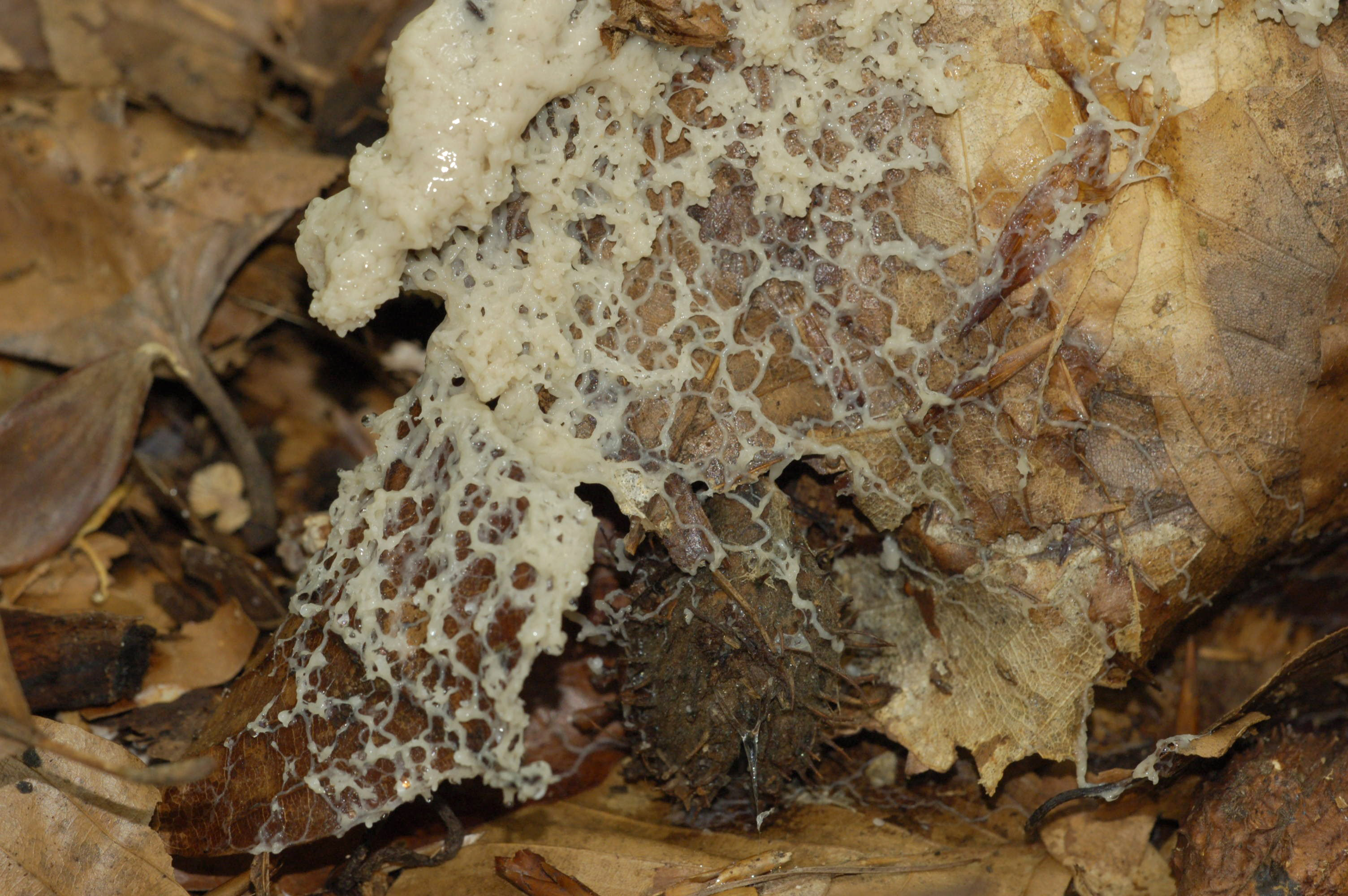
Mucilago crustacea aggregating from a streaming plasmodium (network of filaments) to a sporangium (large mass)

=== Cellular slime molds: Dictyosteliida ===
The Dictyosteliida or cellular slime molds do not form huge coenocytes like the Myxogastria; their amoebae remain individual for most of their lives as individual unicellular protists, feeding on microorganisms. When food is depleted and they are ready to form sporangia, they form swarms. The amoebae join up into a tiny multicellular slug which crawls to an open lit place and grows into a fruiting body, a sorocarp. Some of the amoebae become spores to begin the next generation, but others sacrifice themselves to become a dead stalk, lifting the spores up into the air.

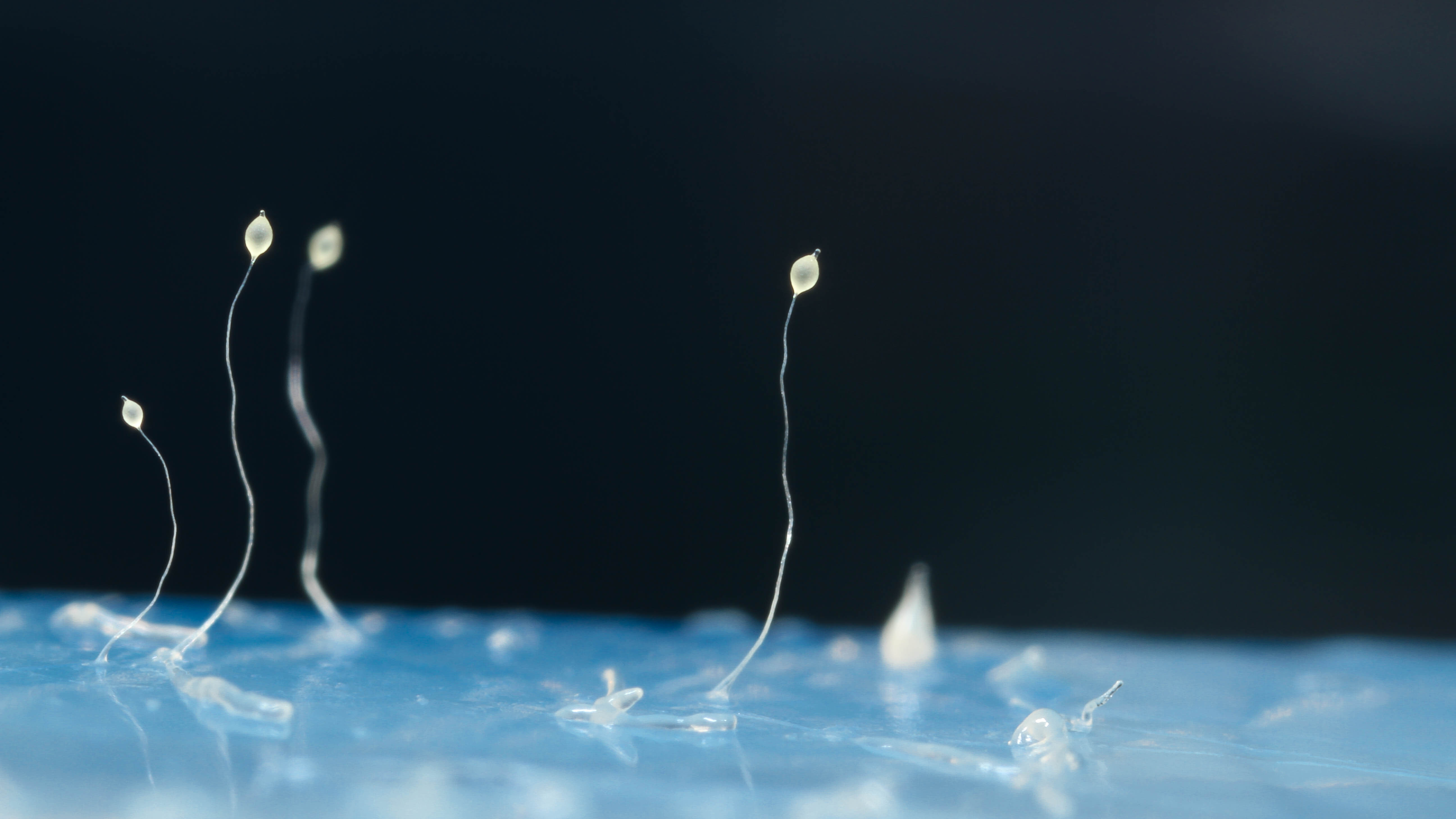
Dictyostelium discoideum is a microscopic organism. The cells can aggregate to form a grex or slug, and then to a sorocarp or fruiting body (shown) on a delicate stalk.

=== Protosteliida ===
The Protosteliida, a polyphyletic group, have characters intermediate between the previous two groups, but they are much smaller, the fruiting bodies only forming one to a few spores.

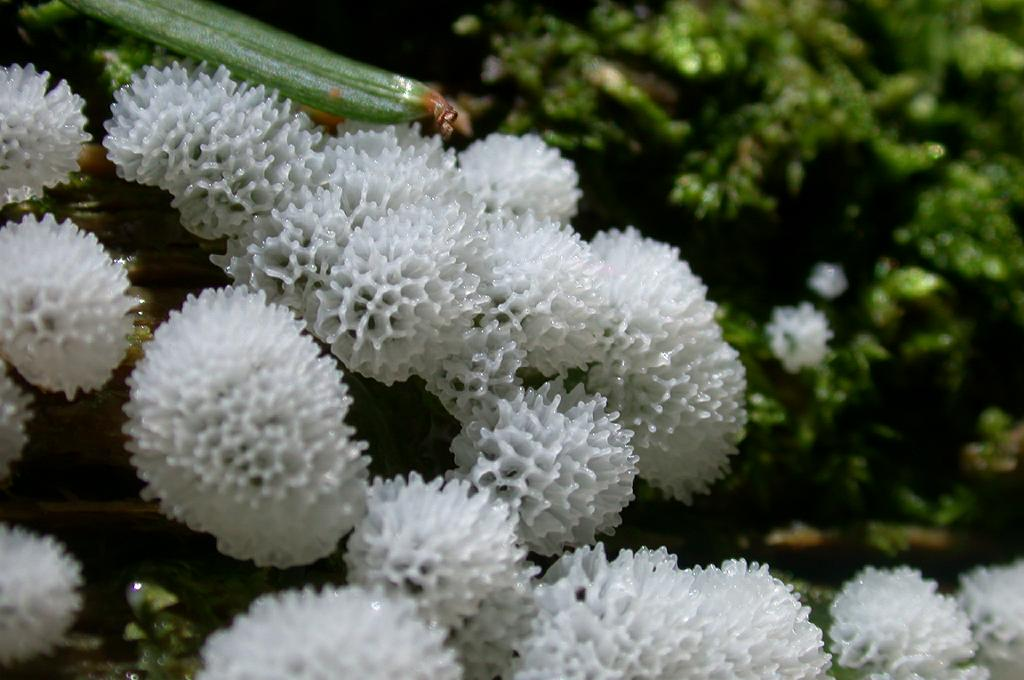
Ceratiomyxa is microscopic; each stalk is topped by only one or a very few spores.

=== Copromyxa ===
The lobosans, a paraphyletic group of amoebae, include the Copromyxa slime molds.

=== Non-amoebozoan slime molds ===
Among the non-amoebozoan slime molds are the Acrasids, which have sluglike amoebae. In locomotion, the amoebae's pseudopodia are eruptive, meaning that hemispherical bulges appear at the front. The Phytomyxea are obligate parasites, with hosts among the plants, diatoms, oomycetes, and brown algae. They cause plant diseases like cabbage club root and powdery scab. The Labyrinthulomycetes are marine slime nets, forming labyrinthine networks of tubes in which amoeba without pseudopods can travel. The Fonticulida are cellular slime molds that form a fruiting body in a "volcano" shape.

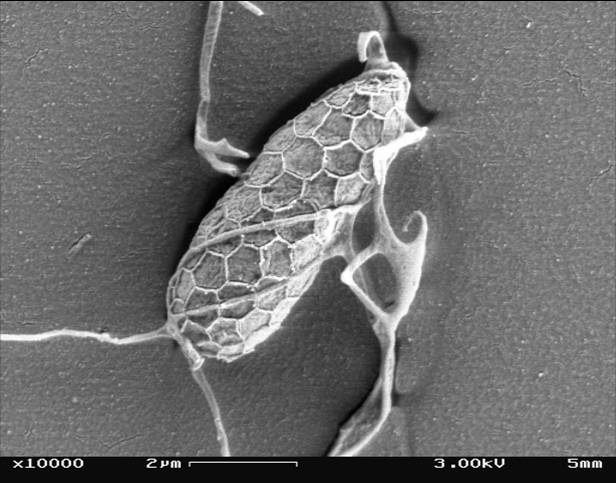
The Labyrinthulomycete Aplanochytrium is a marine protist.

== Distribution, habitats, and ecology ==
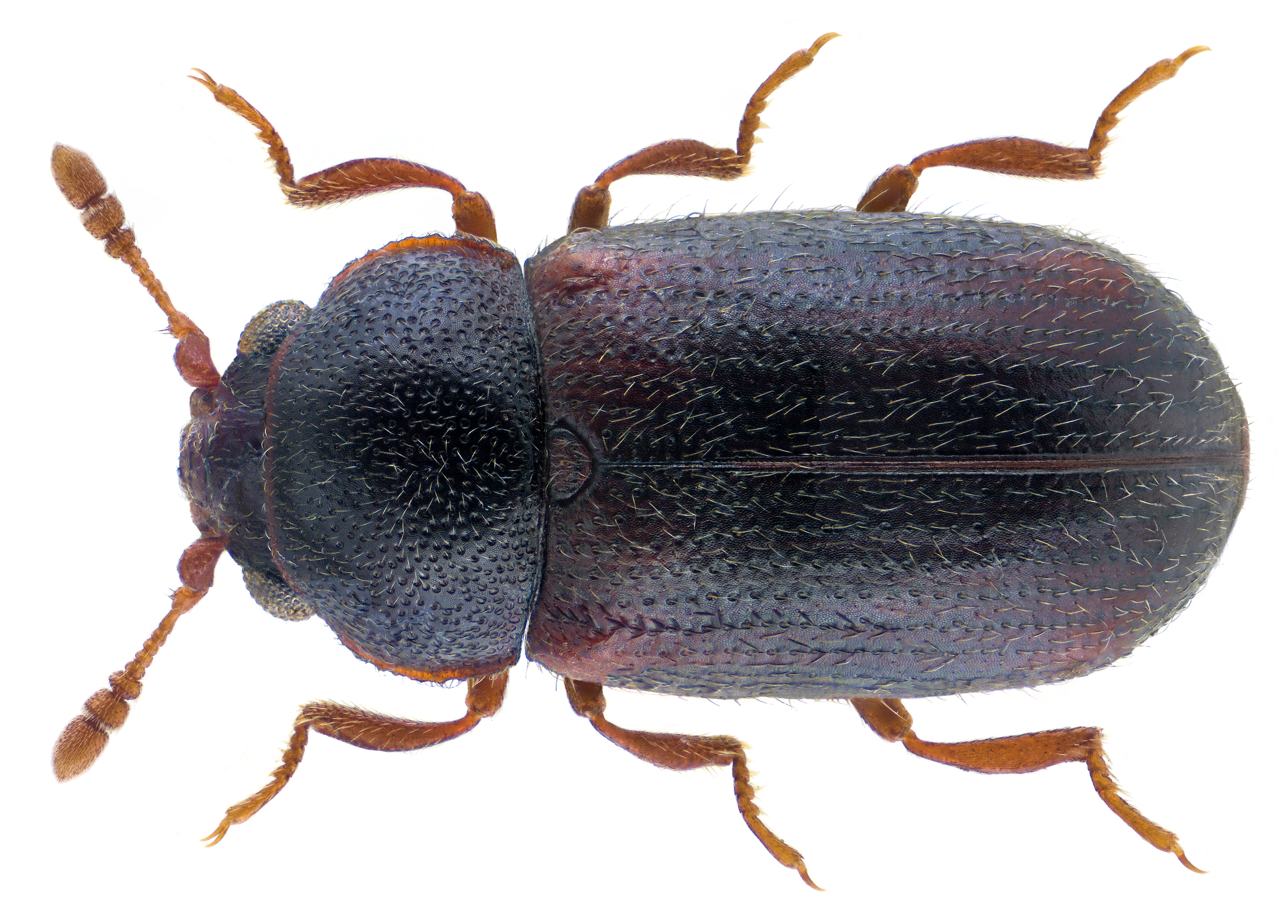
Slime mold beetles such as Sphindus dubius feed exclusively on slime molds.

Slime molds, with their small size and moist surface, live mostly in damp habitats including shaded forests, rotting wood, fallen or living leaves, and on bryophytes. Most Myxogastria are terrestrial, though some, such as Didymium aquatilis, are aquatic, and D. nigripes is semi-aquatic. Myxogastria are not limited to wet regions; 34 species are known from Saudi Arabia, living on bark, in plant litter and rotting wood, and even in deserts. They also occur in Arizona's Sonoran Desert (46 species), and in Chile's exceptionally dry Atacama Desert (24 species). In contrast, the semi-dry Tehuacán-Cuicatlán Biosphere Reserve has 105 species, and Russia and Kazakhstan's Volga river basin has 158 species. In tropical rainforests of Latin America, species such as of Arcyria and Didymium are commonly epiphyllous, growing on the leaves of liverworts. Eumycetozoa flourish in swamp forests, such as the Knyszyn Forest of Poland.

The dictyostelids are mostly terrestrial. On Changbai Mountain in China, six species of dictyostelids were found in forest soils at elevations up to 2,038 m (6,686 ft), the highest recorded species there being Dictyostelium mucoroides. The protostelids live mainly on dead plant matter, where they consume the spores of bacteria, yeasts, and fungi. They include some aquatic species, which live on dead plant parts submerged in ponds. Cellular slime molds are most numerous in the tropics, decreasing with latitude, but are cosmopolitan in distribution, occurring in soil even in the Arctic and the Antarctic. In the Alaskan tundra, the only slime molds are the dictyostelids D. mucoroides and D. sphaerocephalum.

The species of Copromyxa are coprophilous, feeding on dung.

Some myxogastrians have their spores dispersed by animals. The slime mold fly Epicypta testata lay its eggs within the spore mass of Enteridium lycoperdon, which the larvae feed on. These pupate, and the hatching adults carry and disperse spores that have stuck to them. While various insects consume slime molds, Sphindidae slime mold beetles, both larvae and adults, feed exclusively on them.

== Life cycle ==
=== Plasmodial slime molds ===
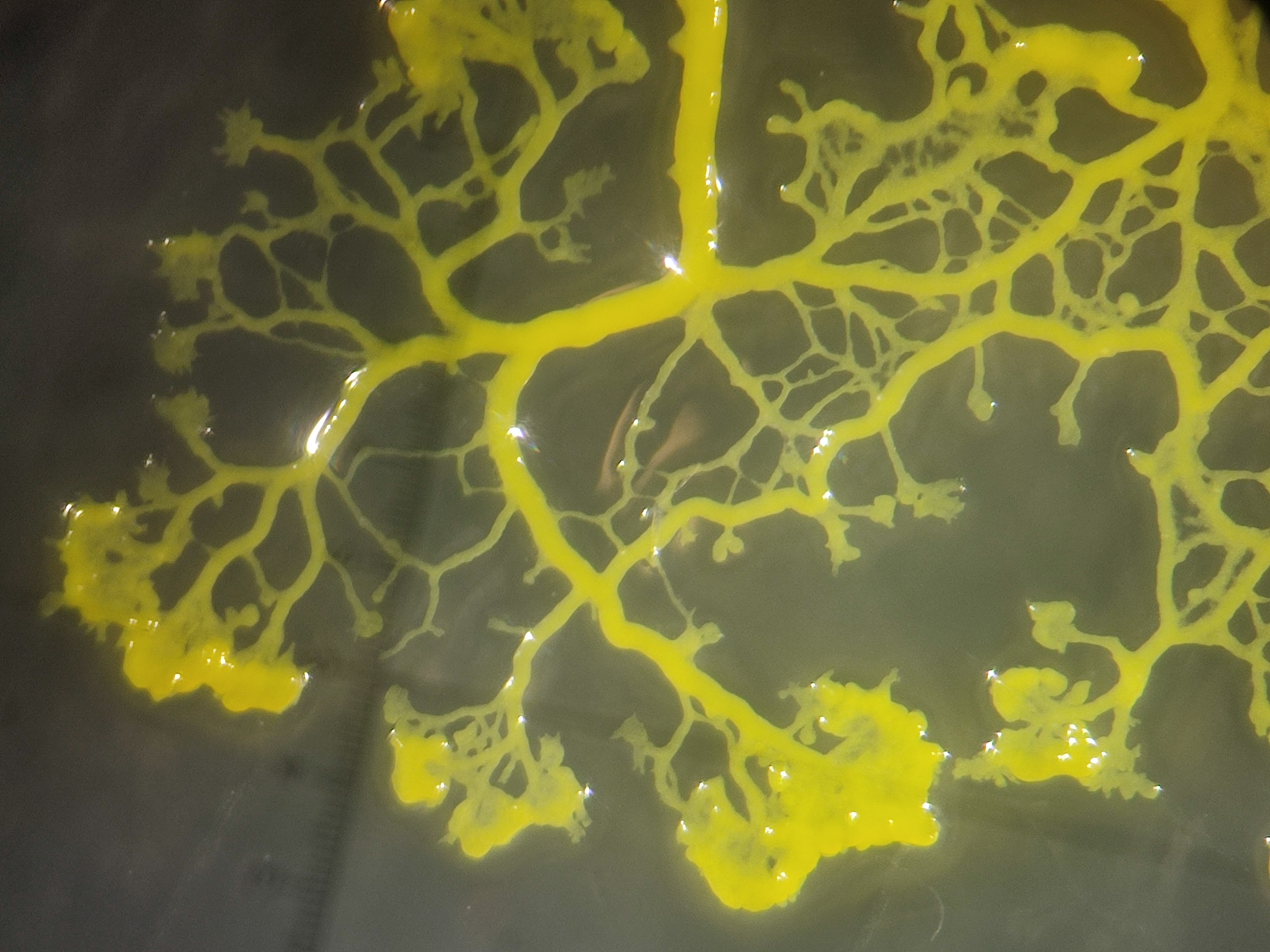
Long strands of Physarum polycephalum streaming along as it forms a plasmodium with many nuclei without individual cell membranes

Plasmodial slime molds begin life as amoeba-like cells. These unicellular amoebae are commonly haploid and feed on small prey such as bacteria, yeast cells, and fungal spores by phagocytosis, engulfing them with its cell membrane. These amoebae can mate if they encounter the correct mating type and form zygotes that then grow into plasmodia. These contain many nuclei without cell membranes between them, and can grow to meters in size. The species Fuligo septica is often seen as a slimy yellow network in and on rotting logs. The amoebae and the plasmodia engulf microorganisms. The plasmodium grows into an interconnected network of protoplasmic strands. Within each protoplasmic strand, the cytoplasmic contents rapidly stream, periodically reversing direction. The streaming protoplasm within a plasmodial strand can reach speeds of up to 1.35 mm per second in Physarum polycephalum, the fastest for any microorganism.

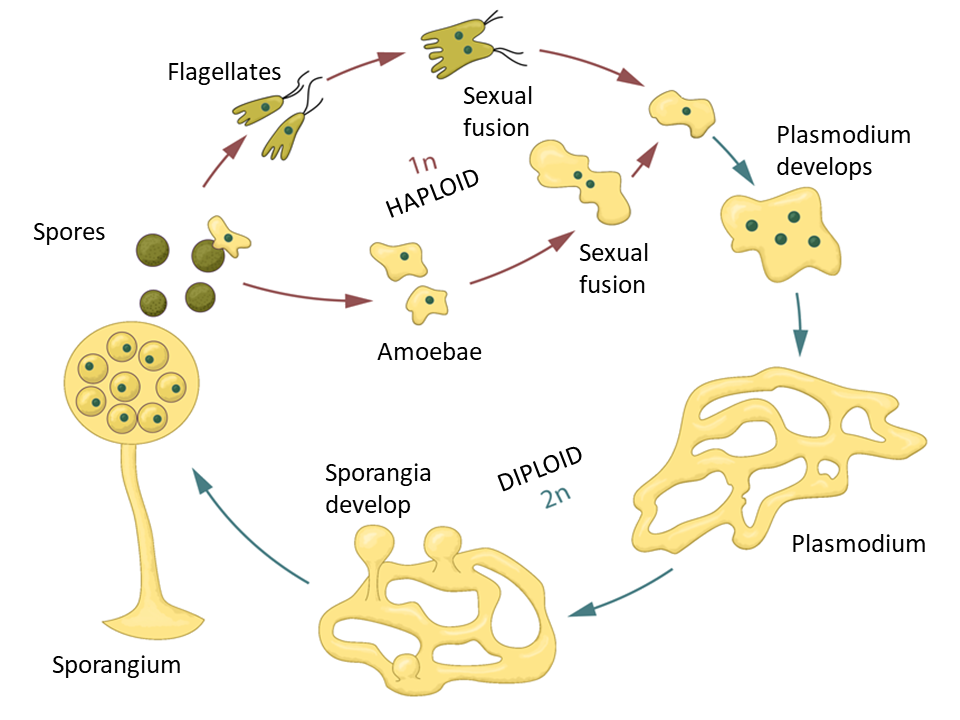
Life cycle of a plasmodial slime mold. Haploid gametes undergo sexual fusion to form a diploid cell. Its nucleus divides (but the cell does not) to form a multinucleate plasmodium. Meiosis halves the number of chromosomes to form haploid cells with just one nucleus.

Slime molds are isogamous, which means that their gametes (reproductive cells) are all the same size, unlike the eggs and sperms of animals. Physarum polycephalum has three genes involved in reproduction: matA and matB, with thirteen variants each, and matC with three variants. Each reproductively mature slime mold is diploid, meaning that it contains two copies of each of the three reproductive genes. When P. polycephalum is ready to make its reproductive cells, it grows a bulbous extension of its body to contain them. Each cell has a random combination of the genes that the slime mold contains within its genome. Therefore, it can create cells of up to eight different gene types. Released cells then independently seek another compatible cell for fusion. Other individuals of P. polycephalum may contain different combinations of the matA, matB, and matC genes, allowing over 500 possible variations. It is advantageous for organisms with this type of reproductive cell to have many mating types because the likelihood of the cells finding a partner is greatly increased, and the risk of inbreeding is drastically reduced.

=== Cellular slime molds ===
The cellular slime molds comprise approximately 150 described species. They occur primarily in the humus layer of forest soils and feed on bacteria but are also found in animal dung and agricultural fields. They exist as single-celled organisms when food is plentiful. When food is in short supply, many of the single-celled amoebae congregate and start moving as a single body, called a 'slug'. The ability of the single celled organisms to aggregate into multicellular forms are why they are also called the social amoebae. In this state they are sensitive to airborne chemicals and can detect food sources. They readily change the shape and function of parts, and may form stalks that produce fruiting bodies, releasing countless spores, light enough to be carried on the wind or on passing animals. The cellular slime mold Dictyostelium discoideum has many different mating types. When this organism has entered the stage of reproduction, it releases a chemical attractant. When it comes time for the cells to fuse, Dictyostelium discoideum has mating types of its own that dictate which cells are compatible with each other. There are at least eleven mating types; macrocysts form after cell contact between compatible mating types.

==== Chemical signals ====
The first acrasin to be discovered was cyclic AMP, a small molecule common in cells. Acrasins are signals that cause cellular slime mold amoebae to aggregate.

The chemicals that aggregate cellular slime molds are small molecules called acrasins; motion towards a chemical signal is called chemotaxis. The first acrasin to be discovered was cyclic adenosine monophosphate (cyclic AMP), a common cell signaling molecule, in Dictyostelium discoideum. During the aggregation phase of their life cycle, Dictyostelium discoideum amoebae communicate with each other using traveling waves of cyclic AMP. There is an amplification of cyclic AMP when they aggregate. Pre-stalk cells move toward cyclic AMP, but pre-spore cells ignore the signal. Other acrasins exist; the acrasin for Polysphondylium violaceum, purified in 1983, is the dipeptide glorin. Calcium ions too serve to attract slime mold amoebae, at least at short distances. It has been suggested that acrasins may be taxon-specific, since specificity is required to form an aggregation of genetically similar cells. Many dictyostelid species indeed do not respond to cyclic AMP, but as of 2023 their acrasins remained unknown.

== Study ==
=== Use in research and teaching ===
The practical study of slime molds was facilitated by the introduction of the "moist culture chamber" by H. C. Gilbert and G. W. Martin in 1933. Slime molds can be used to teach convergent evolution, as the habit of forming a stalk with a sporangium that can release spores into the air, off the ground, has evolved repeatedly, such as in myxogastria (eukaryotes) and in myxobacteria (prokaryotes). Further, both the (macroscopic) dictyostelids and the (microscopic) protostelids have a phase with motile amoebae and a phase with a stalk; in the protostelids, the stalk is tiny, supporting just one spore, but the logic of airborne spore dispersal is the same.

O. R. Collins showed that the slime mold Didymium iridis had two strains (+ and −) of cells, equivalent to gametes, that these could form immortal cell lines in culture, and that the system was controlled by alleles of a single gene. This made the species a model organism for exploring incompatibility, asexual reproduction, and mating types.

=== Biochemicals ===
As of 2025, approximately 298 biologically active compounds have been identified in slime molds. Slime molds have been studied for their production of unusual organic compounds, including pigments, antibiotics, and anti-cancer drugs. Pigments include naphthoquinones, physarochrome A, and compounds of tetramic acid. Bisindolylmaleimides produced by Arcyria denudata include some phosphorescent compounds. The sporophores (fruiting bodies) of Arcyria denudata are colored red by arcyriaflavins A–C, which contain an unusual indolo[2,3-a]carbazole alkaloid ring. By 2022, more than 100 pigments had been isolated from slime molds, mostly from sporophores. It has been suggested that the many yellow-to-red pigments might be useful in cosmetics. Some 42% of patients with seasonal allergic rhinitis reacted to myxogastrian spores, so the spores may contribute significantly as airborne allergens.

=== Computation ===
Slime molds share some similarities with neural systems in animals. The membranes of both slime molds and neural cells contain receptor sites, which alter electrical properties of the membrane when it is bound. Therefore, some studies on the early evolution of animal neural systems are inspired by slime molds. When a slime mold mass or mound is physically separated, the cells find their way back to re-unite. Studies on Physarum polycephalum have even shown the organism to have an ability to learn and predict periodic unfavorable conditions in laboratory experiments. John Tyler Bonner, a professor of ecology known for his studies of slime molds, argues that they are "no more than a bag of amoebae encased in a thin slime sheath, yet they manage to have various behaviors that are equal to those of animals who possess muscles and nerves with ganglia – that is, simple brains."

The slime mold algorithm is a meta-heuristic algorithm, based on the behavior of aggregated slime molds as they stream in search of food. It is described as a simple, efficient, and flexible way of solving optimization problems, such as finding the shortest path between nodes in a network. However, it can become trapped in a local optimum.

Toshiyuki Nakagaki and colleagues studied slime molds and their abilities to solve mazes by placing nodes at two points separated by a maze of plastic film. The mold explored all possible paths and solved it for the shortest path.

=== Traffic system inspirations ===
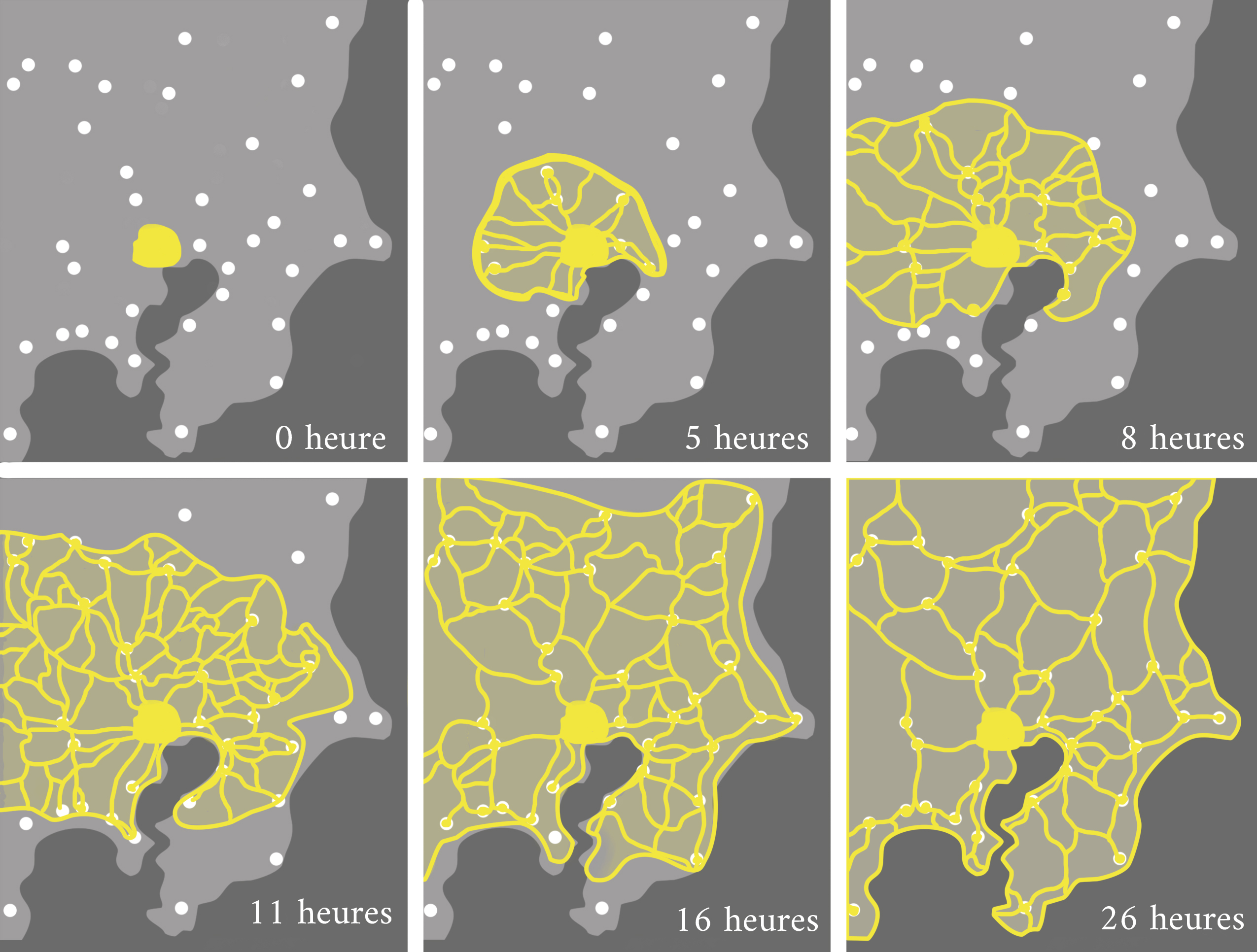
Physarum polycephalum network grown in a period of 26 hours (6 stages shown) to simulate greater Tokyo's rail network

Atsushi Tero and colleagues grew Physarum in a flat wet dish, placing the mold in a central position representing Tokyo, and oat flakes surrounding it corresponding to the locations of other major cities in the Greater Tokyo Area. As Physarum avoids bright light, light was used to simulate mountains, water and other obstacles in the dish. The mold first densely filled the space with plasmodia, and then thinned the network to focus on efficiently connected branches. The network closely resembled Tokyo's rail system. P. polycephalum was used in experimental laboratory approximations of motorway networks of 14 geographical areas: Australia, Africa, Belgium, Brazil, Canada, China, Germany, Iberia, Italy, Malaysia, Mexico, the Netherlands, UK and US. The filamentary structure of P. polycephalum forming a network to food sources is similar to the large scale galaxy filament structure of the universe. This observation has led astronomers to use simulations based on the behaviour of slime molds to inform their search for dark matter.

=== Use as food ===
In central Mexico, the false puffball Enteridium lycoperdon has traditionally been used as food; it is one of the species that mushroom-collectors or hongueros gathered on trips into the forest in the rainy season. One of its local names is "cheese mushroom", so called for its texture and flavor when cooked. It is salted, wrapped in a maize leaf, and baked in the ashes of a campfire; or boiled and eaten with maize tortillas. Fuligo septica is similarly collected in Mexico, cooked with onions and peppers and eaten in a tortilla. In Ecuador, Lycogala epidendrum is called "yakich" and eaten raw as an appetizer.

=== In popular culture ===
Oscar Requejo and N. Floro Andres-Rodriguez suggest that Fuligo septica may have inspired Irvin Yeaworth's 1958 film The Blob, in which a giant amoeba from space sets about engulfing people in a small American town. A type of explosive slime mold is used by Brachydios monsters in the Monster Hunter franchise.

The Latvian Mycological Society holds an annual nomination of slime mold called Slime Mold of the Year in Latvia.

== See also ==
- Swarming motility – Swarm behaviour in bacteria
- Water mold – Fungus-like eukaryotic microorganism
