= Polysphondylium =

Scientific classification
- Domain: Eukaryota
- Clade: Amorphea
- Phylum: Amoebozoa
- Class: Dictyostelia
- Order: Dictyosteliida
- Family: Dictyosteliidae
- Genus: Polysphondylium; Bref. (1884)

Type species
- Polysphondylium violaceum Bref. (1885)

Genus of slime moulds

Polysphondylium is a genus of cellular slime mold, including the species Polysphondylium pallidum. The genus was circumscribed by German mycologist Julius Oscar Brefeld in 1884.

== Species ==
- Polysphondylium acuminatum Vadell & Cavender 1998 nom. inv.
- Polysphondylium aureum Hodgson & Wheller 2001 nom. inv.
- Polysphondylium fuscans Perrigo & Romeralo 2012
- Polysphondylium laterosorum (Cavender 1970) Baldauf, Sheikh & Thulin 2017
- Polysphondylium patagonicum Vadell et al. 2011
- Polysphondylium violaceum Brefeld 1885

== See also ==
- Dictyostelium so-called cellular slime mold.
