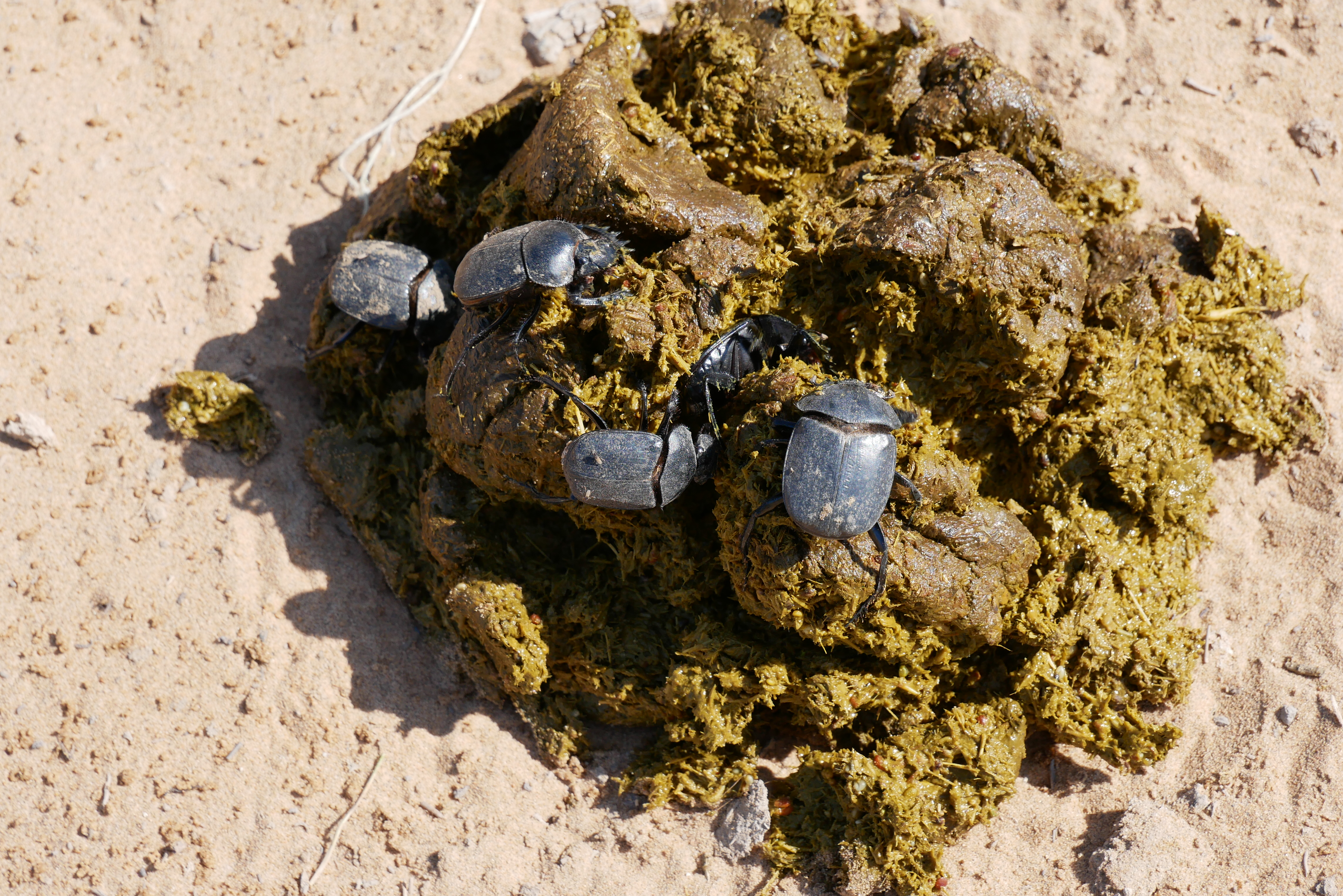
- Scarabaeus sacer (type species)

Scientific classification
- Kingdom: Animalia
- Phylum: Arthropoda
- Class: Insecta
- Order: Coleoptera
- Suborder: Polyphaga
- Infraorder: Scarabaeiformia
- Family: Scarabaeidae
- Subfamily: Scarabaeinae
- Tribe: Scarabaeini; Latreille, 1802

Synonyms
- Gymnopleurini Lacordaire, 1856; Sisyphini Mulsant, 1842; Actinophorini Ádám, 2003; Gymnopleurides Lacordaire, 1856; Pachysomides Ferreira, 1953; Scarabaeïdes Latreille, 1802; Sisyphaires Mulsant, 1842

= Scarabaeini =

Tribe of beetles

The Scarabaeini are a tribe of old-world dung beetle genera, erected by Pierre André Latreille.

== Genera ==
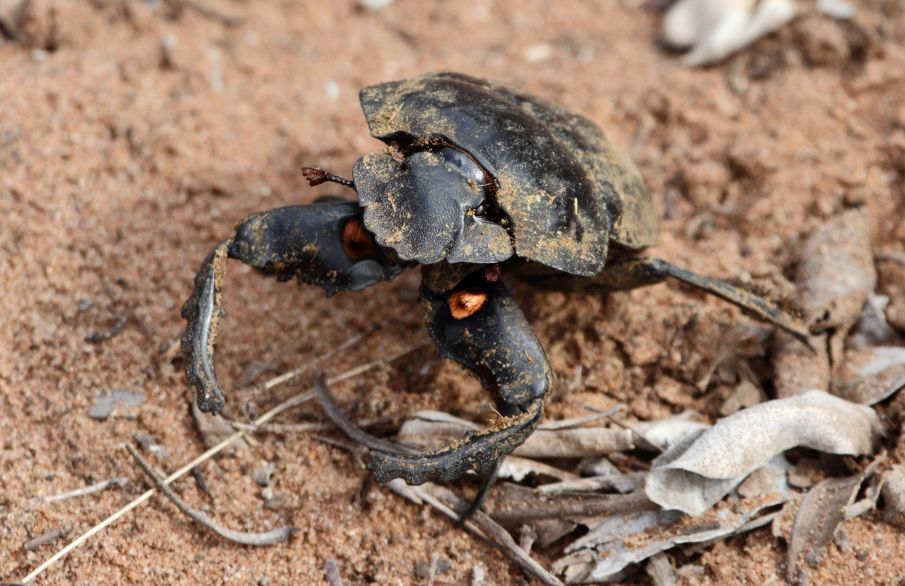
Pachylomera femoralis

BioLib lists:

1. Allogymnopleurus Janssens, 1940
2. Garreta Janssens, 1940
3. Gymnopleurus Illiger, 1803
4. Mnematium MacLeay, 1821
5. Neosisyphus G. Müller, 1942
6. Nesosisyphus Vinson, 1946
7. Pachylomera Kirby, 1828
8. Paragymnopleurus Shipp, 1897
9. Scarabaeus Linnaeus, 1758
10. Sceliages Westwood, 1837
11. Sisyphus Latreille, 1807

Note: a number of taxa including Kheper and Mnematidium are now considered subgenera of Scarabaeus.
