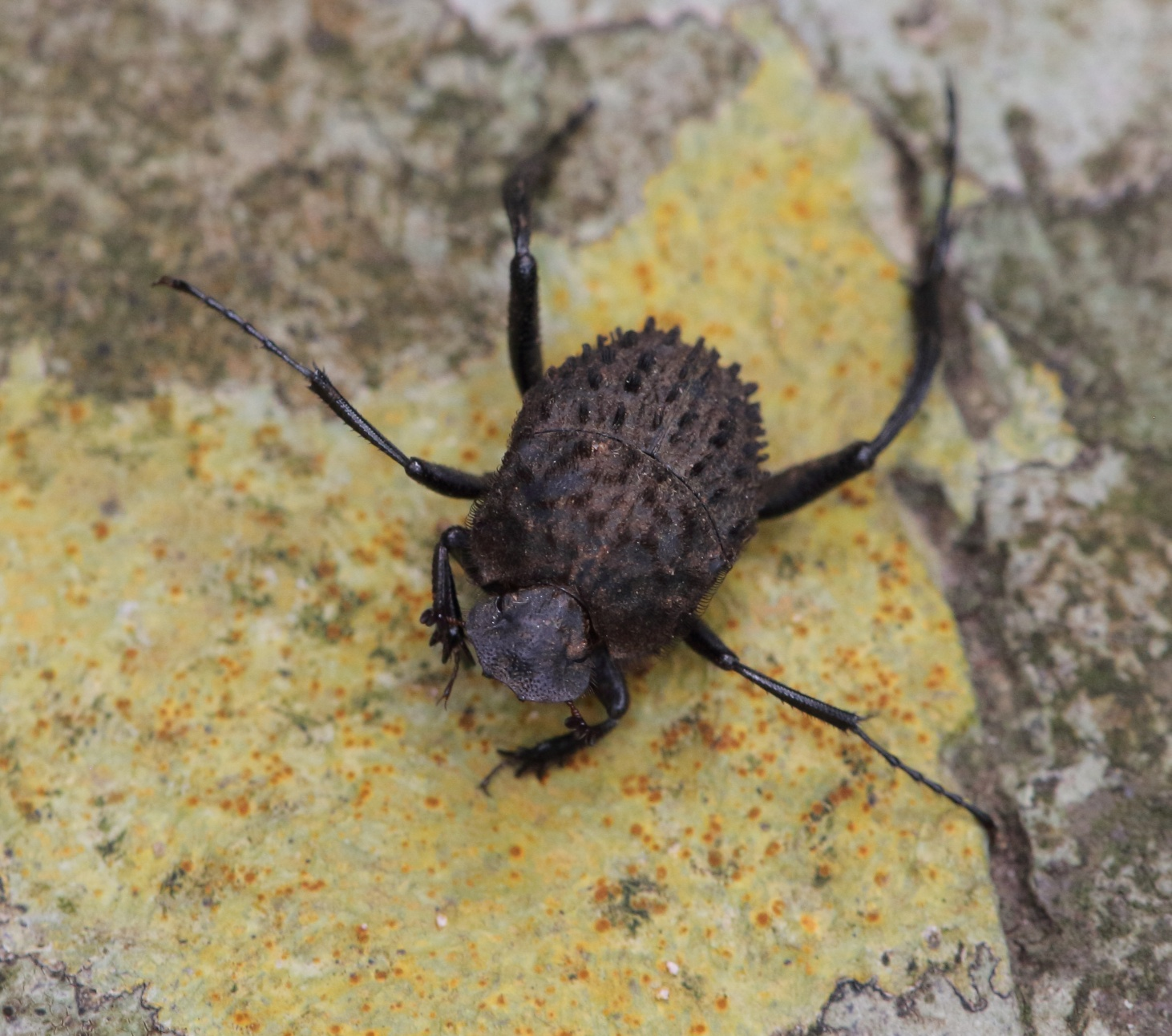
- Sisyphus fasciculatus

Scientific classification
- Kingdom: Animalia
- Phylum: Arthropoda
- Clade: Pancrustacea
- Class: Insecta
- Order: Coleoptera
- Suborder: Polyphaga
- Infraorder: Scarabaeiformia
- Family: Scarabaeidae
- Subfamily: Scarabaeinae
- Tribe: Sisyphini; Mulsant, 1842

= Sisyphini =

Tribe of beetles

Sisyphini is a tribe of scarab beetles, in the dung beetle subfamily (Scarabaeinae), but it may now be combined with the Scarabaeini. The middle and hind legs are very long; the relatively short body is laterally compressed and has flattened sides. Relative to other dung beetles they are of small to moderate size (7–10 mm long).

== Ecology ==
All species fly during the day (diurnal). They are all ball-rollers: a ball is fashioned from the dung, and rolled away from it by a pair of beetles; the male pushes with the back legs and the female pulls with the front legs. A short tunnel is dug in the soil, and the ball is buried at the end of it. After reworking the ball, the female lays an egg in it. The brood is then abandoned; after hatching, larvae feed on the dung ball.

== Taxonomy ==
There are three genera in this tribe:

- Nesosisyphus - Four species, all endemic to Mauritius
- Neosisyphus - 24 species; 22 in Africa and two in the Oriental region
- Sisyphus - 32 species; 20 in Africa
