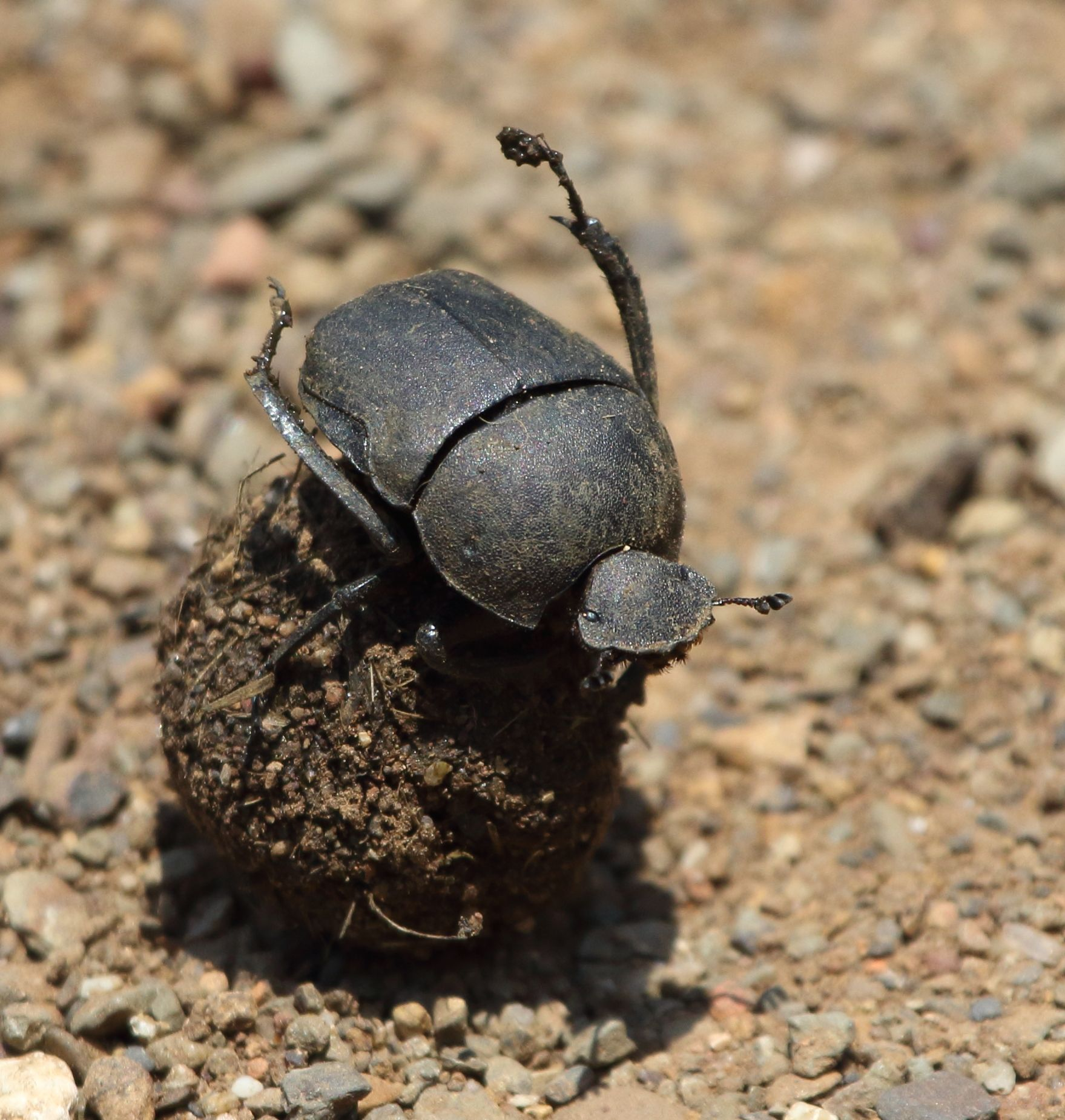
- Garreta unicolor on a ball of rhinoceros dung

Scientific classification
- Domain: Eukaryota
- Kingdom: Animalia
- Phylum: Arthropoda
- Class: Insecta
- Order: Coleoptera
- Suborder: Polyphaga
- Infraorder: Scarabaeiformia
- Family: Scarabaeidae
- Subfamily: Scarabaeinae
- Tribe: Gymnopleurini; Lacordaire, 1856

= Gymnopleurini =

Tribe of beetles

Gymnopleurini is a tribe of scarab beetles, in the dung beetle subfamily (Scarabaeinae), but it may now be combined with the Scarabaeini. The side edge of each elytron (hardened fore-wing protecting the hind-wing) has a characteristic shape that exposed the underlying pleural sclerites (side plates of the abdomen). Relative to other dung beetles they are of moderate size (10–18 mm long).

== Ecology ==
All species fly during the day (diurnal). They are probably all ball-rollers: a ball is fashioned from the dung, and rolled away from it, either by a single beetle or a pair of beetles. A short tunnel is dug in the soil, and the ball is buried at the end of it. After reworking the ball, the female lays an egg in a depression in the ball, and covers it with dung. The brood is then abandoned; after hatching, larvae feed on the dung ball.

== Taxonomy ==
There are four genera in this tribe:

- Allogymnopleurus
- Garreta
- Gymnopleurus
- Paragymnopleurus
