= Sisyphus crispatus =

Scientific classification
- Kingdom: Animalia
- Phylum: Arthropoda
- Class: Insecta
- Order: Coleoptera
- Suborder: Polyphaga
- Infraorder: Scarabaeiformia
- Family: Scarabaeidae
- Genus: Sisyphus
- Species: S. crispatus

Binomial name
- Sisyphus crispatus Gory, 1833

Subspecies
- S. c. crispatus; S. c. hirtus Wiedemann, 1823; S. c. mexicanus Harold, 1863

Synonyms
- Sisyphus hirtus Wiedemann, 1823; Sisyphus setosulus Walker, 1858; Sisyphus subsidens Walker, 1858

Species of beetle

Sisyphus crispatus, is a species of dung beetle found in India, Sri Lanka and Pakistan.

== Description ==
The subspecies, S. c. hirtus has been described as follows.

This oval, highly convex species has an average length of about 6 to 9.5 mm. Body black and opaque. Body covered with brown erect hooked setae. Setae absent on legs and metasternum. Legs are very long and slender. Head moderately strongly closely punctured. Pronotum moderately strongly closely punctured. Elytra a little longer than their combined width. Elytra have shallow striae and slightly convex intervals. Metasternum consists of large punctures. Male has a very slight rectangular projection near the middle of hind femur.
