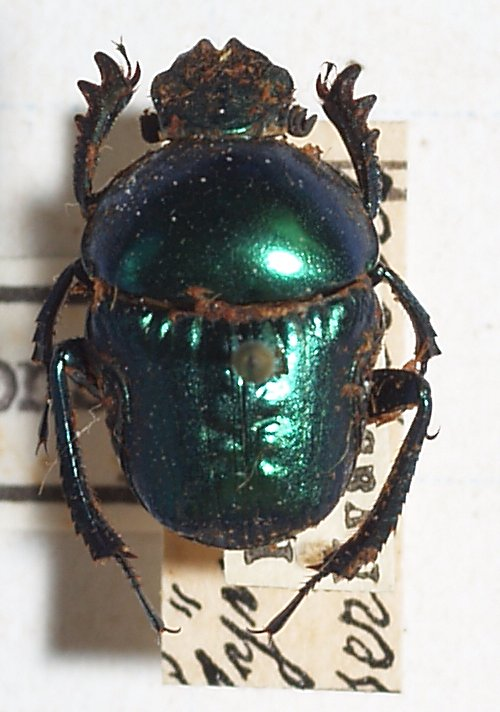

Scientific classification
- Kingdom: Animalia
- Phylum: Arthropoda
- Class: Insecta
- Order: Coleoptera
- Suborder: Polyphaga
- Infraorder: Scarabaeiformia
- Family: Scarabaeidae
- Genus: Gymnopleurus
- Species: G. sericeifrons

Binomial name
- Gymnopleurus sericeifrons Fairmaire, 1887

Synonyms
- Gymnopleurus aeneipes Fairmaire, 1893; Gymnopleurus krugeri Kolbe, 1895; Gymnopleurus sericeifrons subsp. abyssinicus Müller, 1941; Gymnopleurus sericeifrons subsp. chlorophanus Müller, 1941; Gymnopleurus sericeifrons subsp. cuprarius Kolbe, 1914; Gymnopleurus sericeifrons subsp. cyaneus Kolbe, 1914; Gymnopleurus sericeifrons subsp. subauratus Kolbe, 1914

= Gymnopleurus sericeifrons =

Species of beetle

Gymnopleurus sericeifrons is a species of dung beetle found in Afro-tropical countries such as Mozambique, Kenya, India and Sri Lanka.

== Images ==
- Images of Gymnopleurus sericeifrons
