= Gymnopleurus parvus =

Scientific classification
- Kingdom: Animalia
- Phylum: Arthropoda
- Class: Insecta
- Order: Coleoptera
- Suborder: Polyphaga
- Infraorder: Scarabaeiformia
- Family: Scarabaeidae
- Genus: Gymnopleurus
- Species: G. parvus

Binomial name
- Gymnopleurus parvus (MacLeay, 1821)

Synonyms
- Scarabaeus parvus MacLeay, 1821

Species of beetle

Gymnopleurus parvus is a species of dung beetle found in India, Sri Lanka and Bangladesh.
