= Garreta smaragdifer =

Scientific classification
- Kingdom: Animalia
- Phylum: Arthropoda
- Clade: Pancrustacea
- Class: Insecta
- Order: Coleoptera
- Suborder: Polyphaga
- Infraorder: Scarabaeiformia
- Family: Scarabaeidae
- Genus: Garreta
- Species: G. smaragdifer

Binomial name
- Garreta smaragdifer (Walker, 1858)

Synonyms
- Gymnopleurus smaragdifer Walker, 1858

Species of beetle

Garreta smaragdifer is a species of dung beetle native to India and Sri Lanka.

== Description ==
This very broadly oval, convex species has an average length of about 17 to 18 mm.
