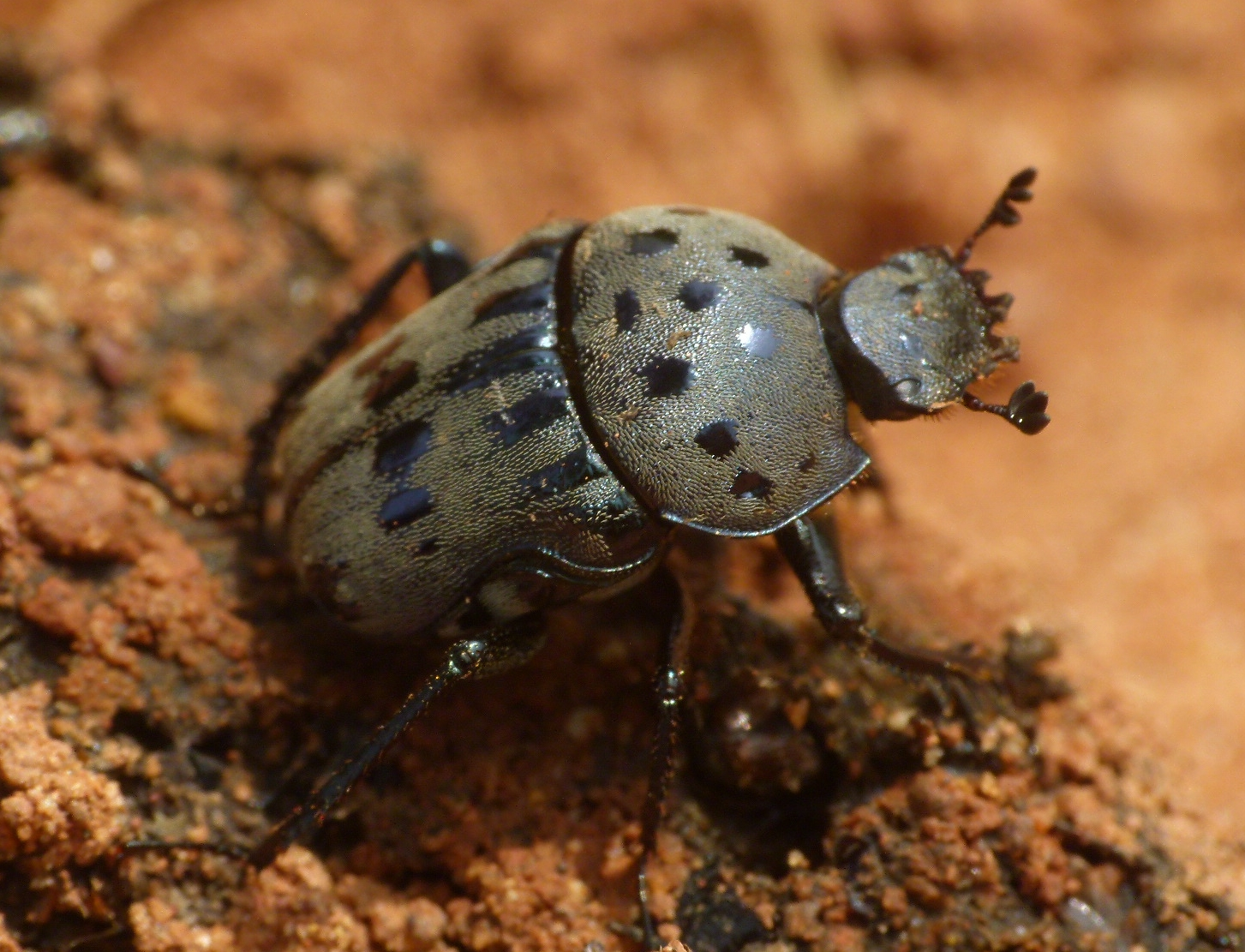

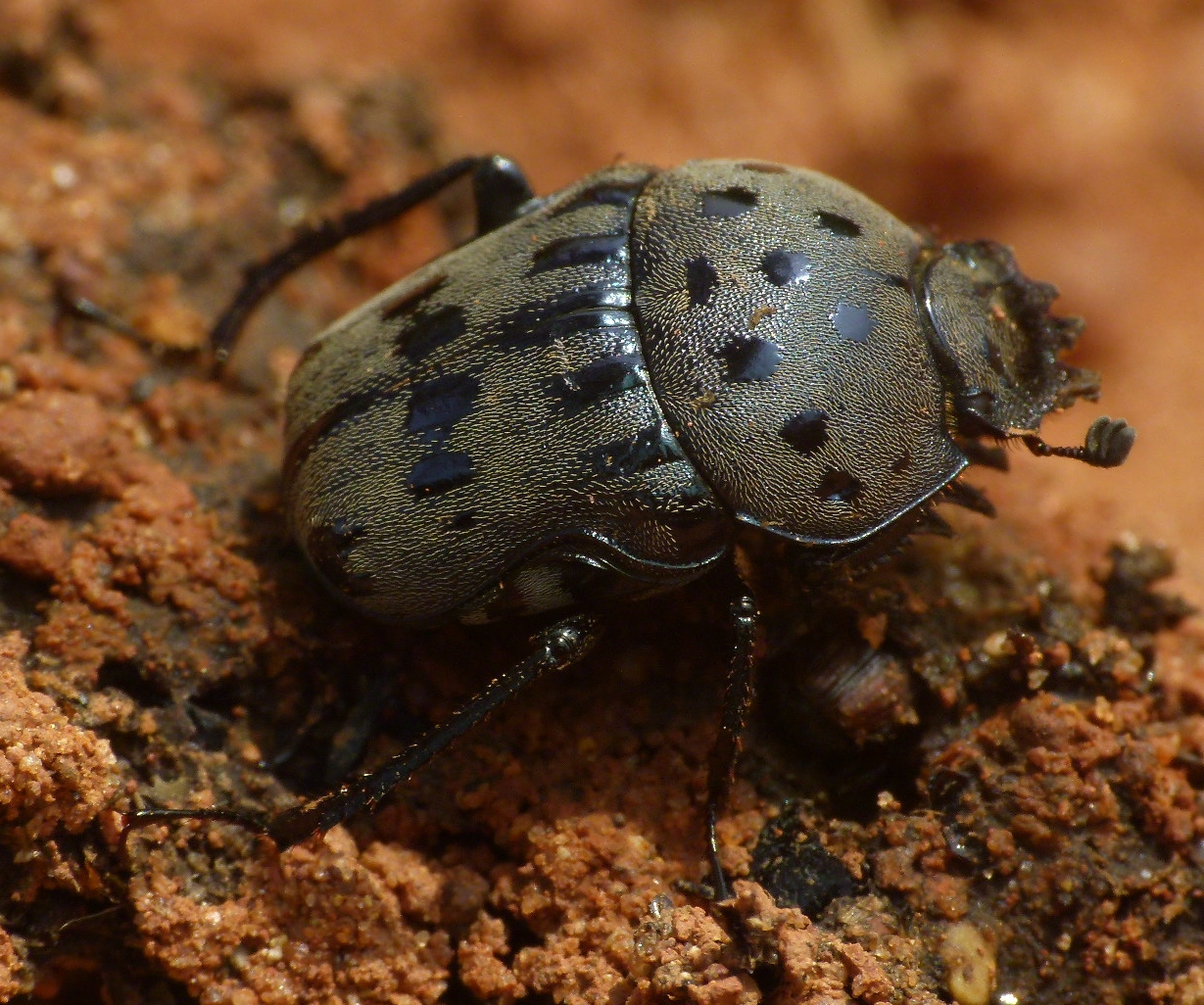

Scientific classification
- Kingdom: Animalia
- Phylum: Arthropoda
- Class: Insecta
- Order: Coleoptera
- Suborder: Polyphaga
- Infraorder: Scarabaeiformia
- Family: Scarabaeidae
- Genus: Gymnopleurus
- Species: G. miliaris

Binomial name
- Gymnopleurus miliaris (Fabricius, 1775)

Synonyms
- Scarabaeus miliaris Fabricius, 1775

= Gymnopleurus miliaris =

Species of beetle

Gymnopleurus miliaris is a species of dung beetle found in India, Sri Lanka, Afghanistan, and Bhutan.

== Description ==
This broad, less convex species has an average length of about 7.5 to 11.5 mm.
