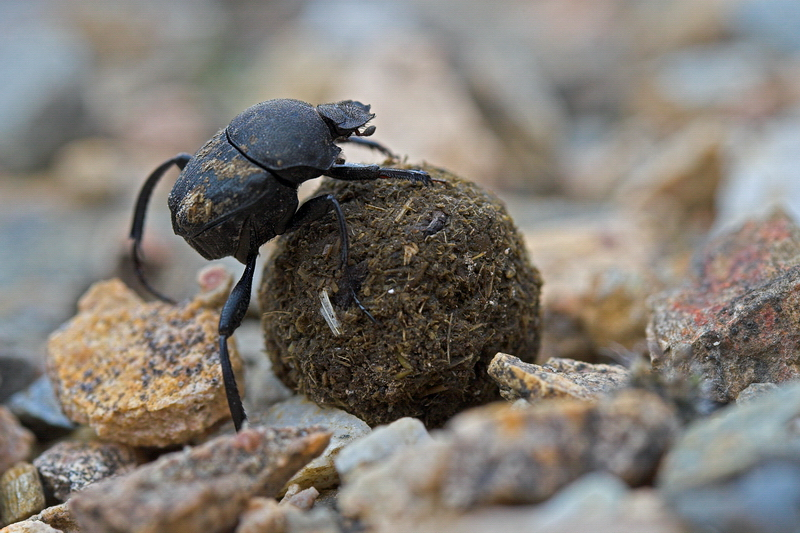

Scientific classification
- Kingdom: Animalia
- Phylum: Arthropoda
- Clade: Pancrustacea
- Class: Insecta
- Order: Coleoptera
- Suborder: Polyphaga
- Infraorder: Scarabaeiformia
- Family: Scarabaeidae
- Genus: Sisyphus
- Species: S. schaefferi

Binomial name
- Sisyphus schaefferi Linnaeus, 1758

= Sisyphus schaefferi =

Species of beetle

Sisyphus schaefferi is a species of dung beetle in the family Scarabaeidae. It mostly occurs in the steppe and semi-desert biotopes of Europe.

== Taxonomy ==
Sisyphus schaefferi contains the following subspecies:

- Sisyphus schaefferi morio
- Sisyphus schaefferi boschniaki
- Sisyphus schaefferi schaefferi
