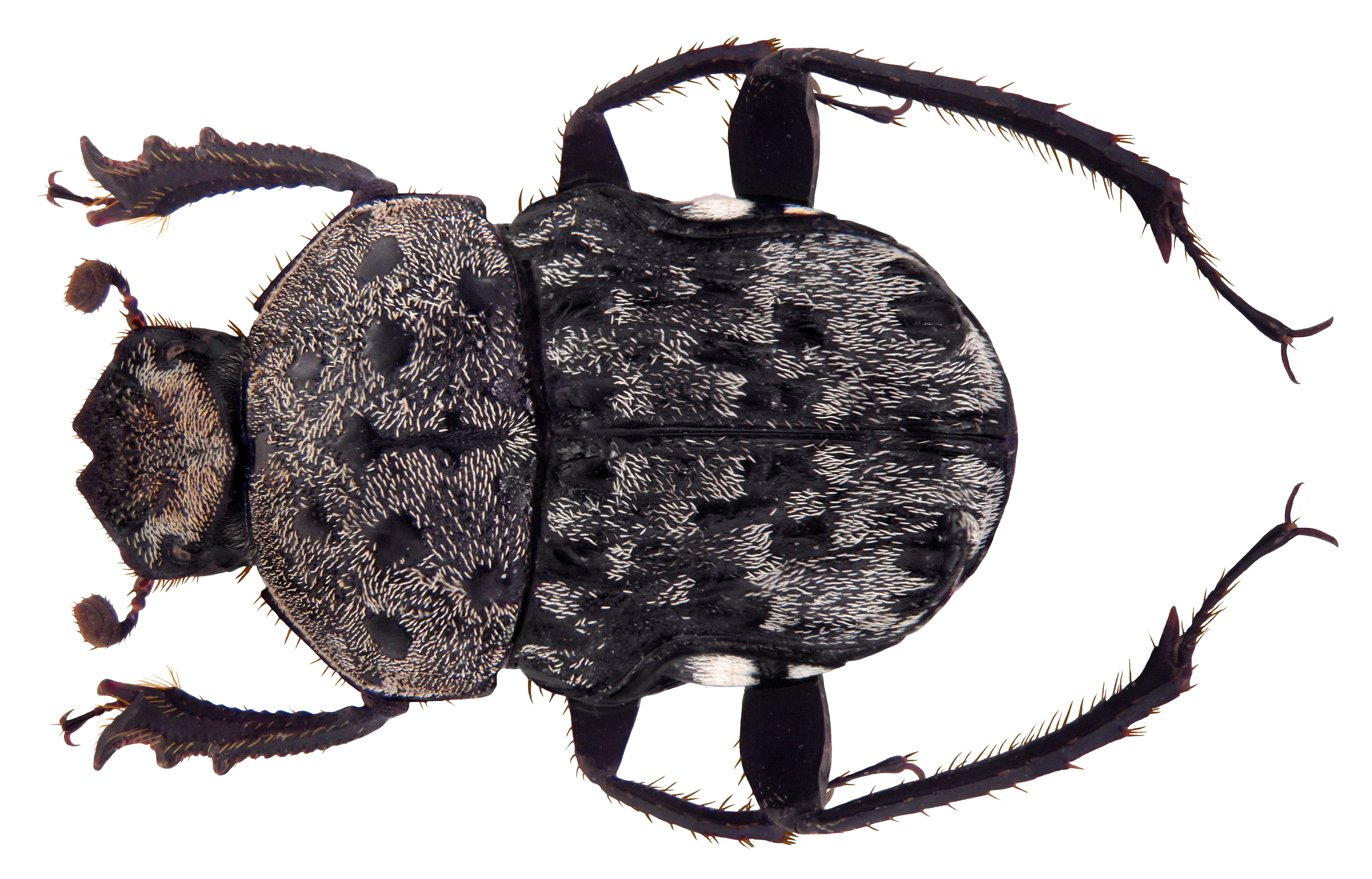

Scientific classification
- Kingdom: Animalia
- Phylum: Arthropoda
- Class: Insecta
- Order: Coleoptera
- Suborder: Polyphaga
- Infraorder: Scarabaeiformia
- Family: Scarabaeidae
- Genus: Gymnopleurus
- Species: G. gemmatus

Binomial name
- Gymnopleurus gemmatus (Harold, 1871)

Synonyms
- Scarabaeus gemmatus Harold, 1871; Scarabaeus granulatus Fabricius, 1792

= Gymnopleurus gemmatus =

Species of beetle

Gymnopleurus gemmatus, is a species of dung beetle found in India, and Sri Lanka.
