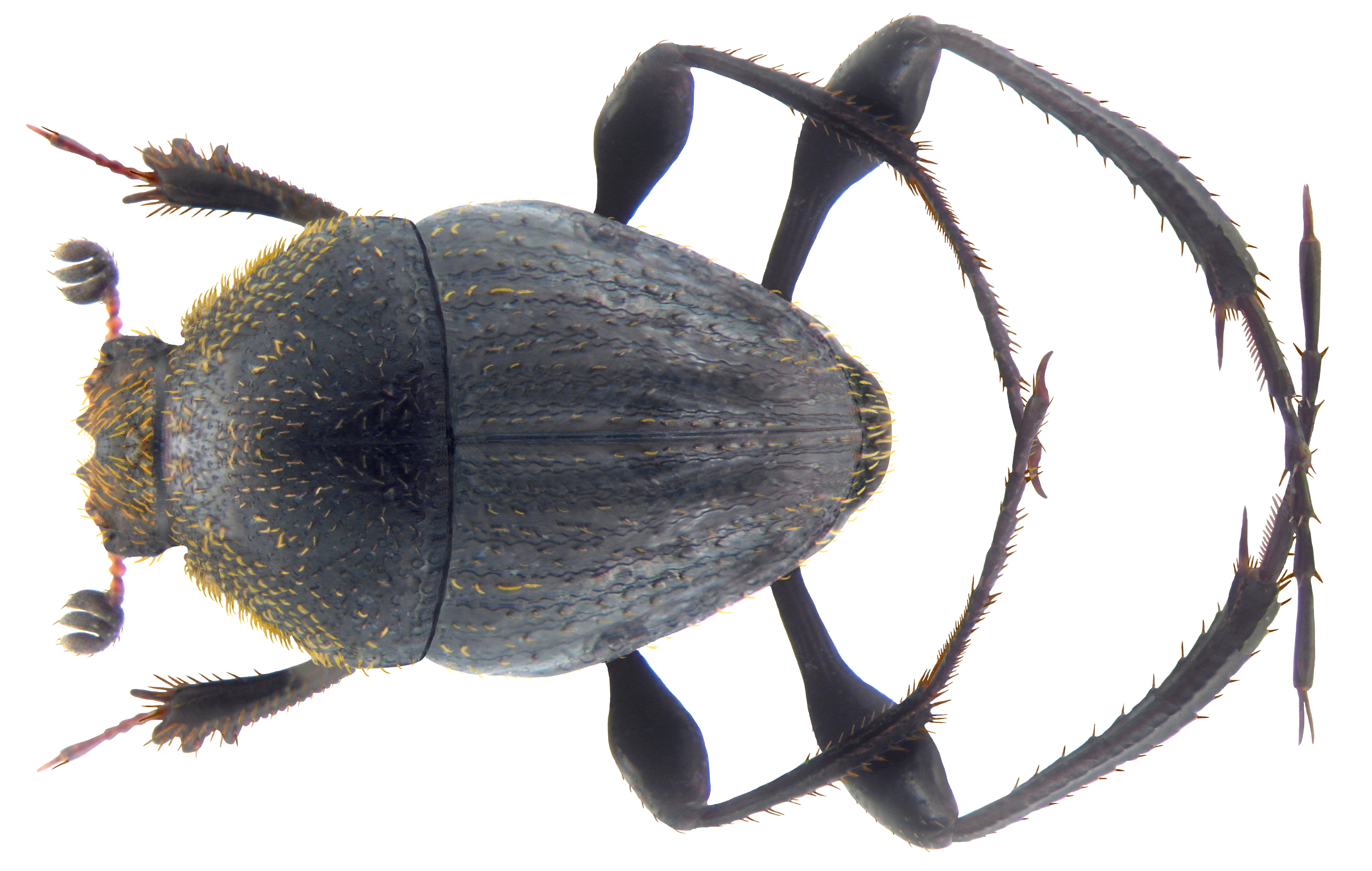

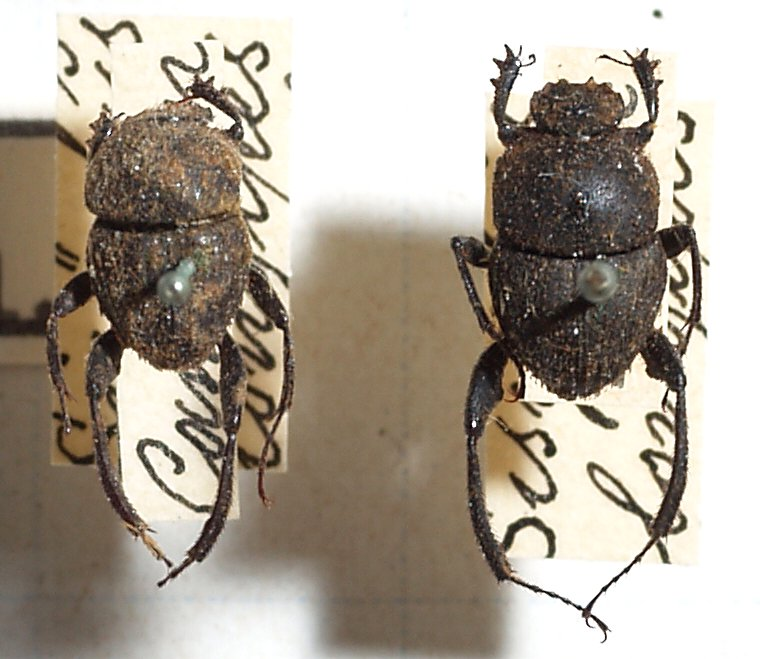

Scientific classification
- Kingdom: Animalia
- Phylum: Arthropoda
- Clade: Pancrustacea
- Class: Insecta
- Order: Coleoptera
- Suborder: Polyphaga
- Infraorder: Scarabaeiformia
- Family: Scarabaeidae
- Genus: Sisyphus
- Species: S. longipes

Binomial name
- Sisyphus longipes (Olivier, 1789)

Synonyms
- Copris helwigii Fabricius, 1798; Scarabaeus longipes Olivier, 1789; Scarabaeus minutus Fabricius, 1792

= Sisyphus longipes =

Species of beetle

Sisyphus longipes, is a species of dung beetle found in India, Sri Lanka, Nepal, Myanmar, and Thailand.
