= Neosisyphus tarantula =

Scientific classification
- Kingdom: Animalia
- Phylum: Arthropoda
- Class: Insecta
- Order: Coleoptera
- Suborder: Polyphaga
- Infraorder: Scarabaeiformia
- Family: Scarabaeidae
- Genus: Neosisyphus
- Species: N. tarantula

Binomial name
- Neosisyphus tarantula (Arrow, 1909)

Species of beetle

Neosisyphus tarantula, is a species of dung beetle found in Sri Lanka.

== Description ==
This oval, very convex species has an average length of about 11 mm.
