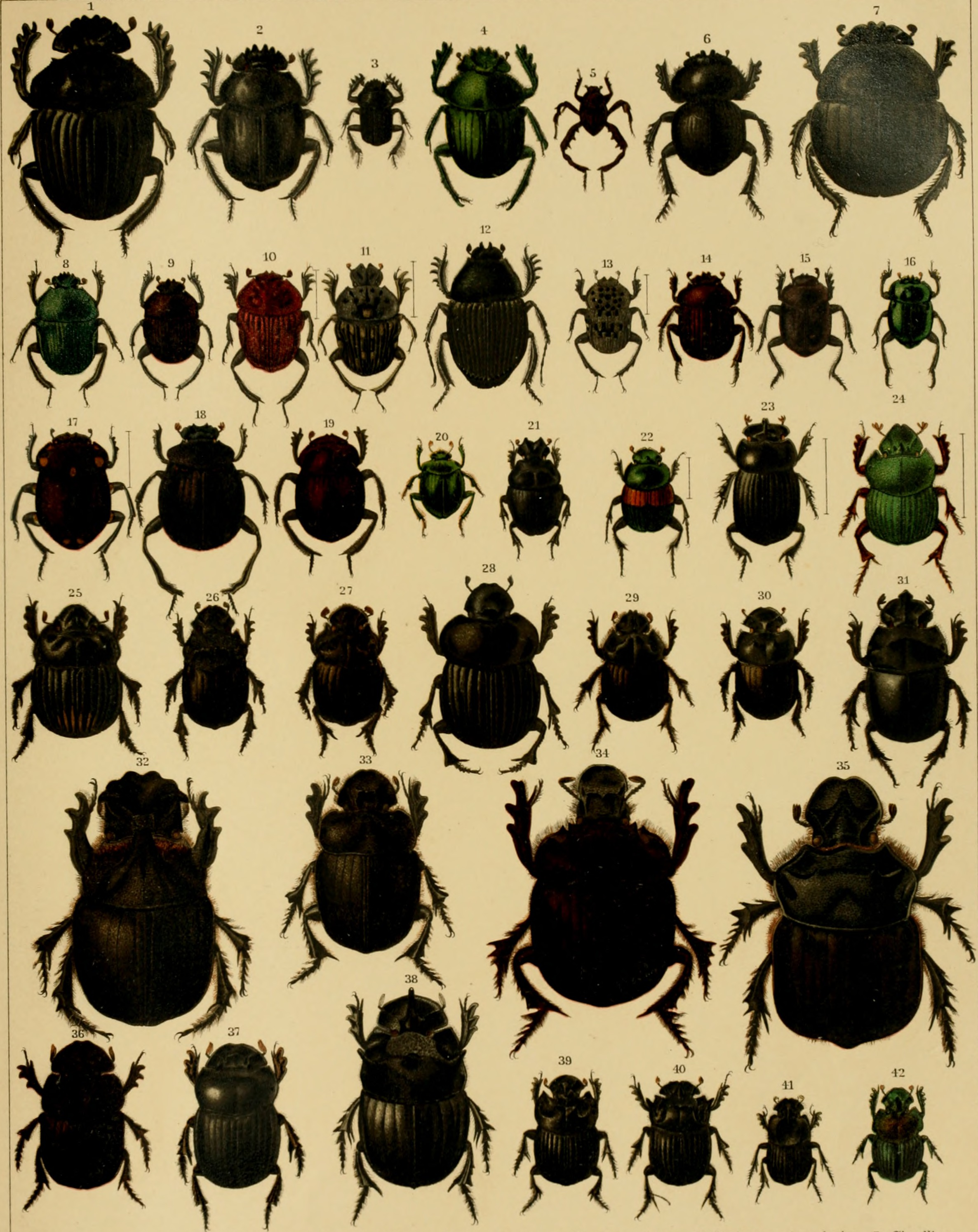

Scientific classification
- Kingdom: Animalia
- Phylum: Arthropoda
- Class: Insecta
- Order: Coleoptera
- Suborder: Polyphaga
- Infraorder: Scarabaeiformia
- Family: Scarabaeidae
- Genus: Gymnopleurus
- Species: G. koenigi

Binomial name
- Gymnopleurus koenigi (Fabricius, 1775)

Synonyms
- Scarabaeus guttatus Gmelin, 1790; Scarabaeus koenigi Fabricius, 1775; Scarabaeus scriptus Pallas, 1781

= Gymnopleurus koenigi =

Species of beetle

Gymnopleurus koenigi is a species of dung beetle found in India, Sri Lanka, Mongolia, and Tibet.
