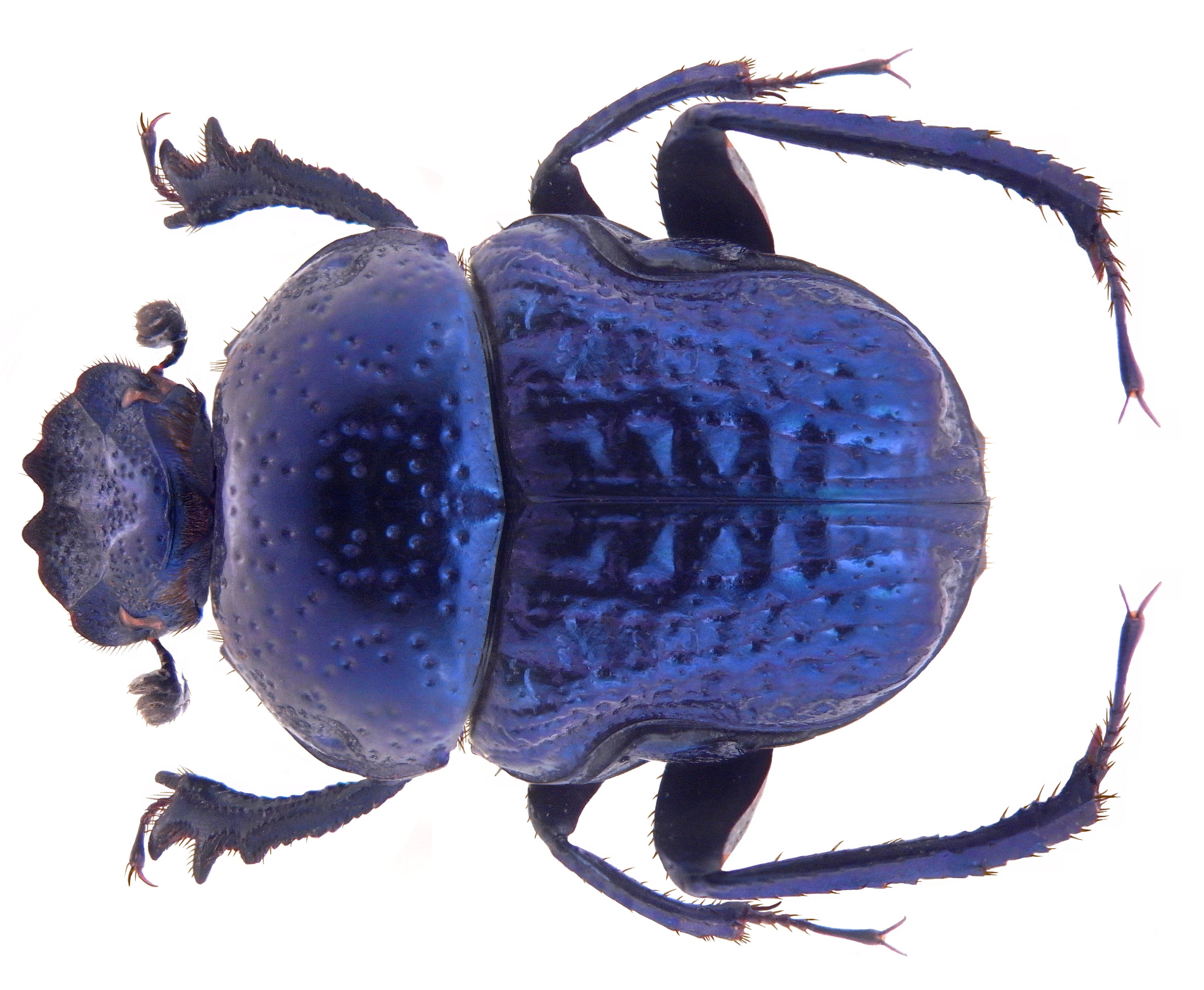

Scientific classification
- Kingdom: Animalia
- Phylum: Arthropoda
- Class: Insecta
- Order: Coleoptera
- Suborder: Polyphaga
- Infraorder: Scarabaeiformia
- Family: Scarabaeidae
- Genus: Gymnopleurus
- Species: G. cyaneus

Binomial name
- Gymnopleurus cyaneus (Fabricius, 1798)

Synonyms
- Copris cyaneus Fabricius, 1798

= Gymnopleurus cyaneus =

Species of beetle

Gymnopleurus cyaneus is a species of dung beetle found in India, Sri Lanka, Nepal and Pakistan.

== Description ==
This oval, less convex species has an average length of about 8 to 12 mm.
