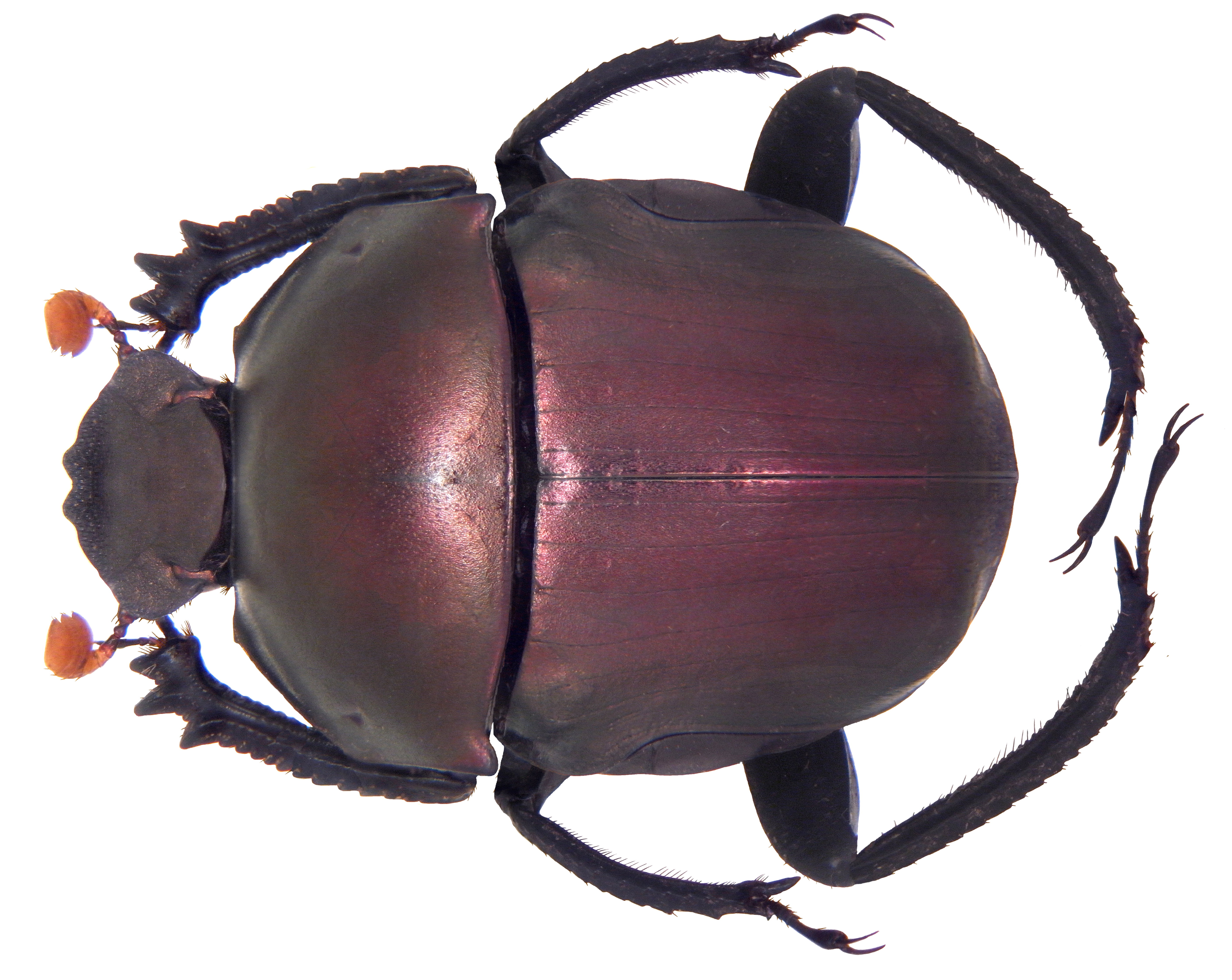
- Paragymnopleurus sinuatus

Scientific classification
- Domain: Eukaryota
- Kingdom: Animalia
- Phylum: Arthropoda
- Class: Insecta
- Order: Coleoptera
- Suborder: Polyphaga
- Infraorder: Scarabaeiformia
- Family: Scarabaeidae
- Subfamily: Scarabaeinae
- Tribe: Scarabaeini
- Genus: Paragymnopleurus; Shipp, 1897

Synonyms
- Progymnopleurus Garreta, 1914

= Paragymnopleurus =

Genus of beetles

Paragymnopleurus is a genus of Asian dung beetles in the tribe Scarabaeini. Species have been recorded from Asia.

== Description ==
Paragymnopleurus are medium-sized, powerful scarab beetles, often black with a metallic lustre. The head is broad and shovel-shaped, the body short and broad. The pronotum is at least as wide as the elytra, which lack dotted stripes. The legs are powerful, with large teeth on the outsides. The forelegs have tarsi which are very short and slender. The body surface often seems somewhat rough or dented, and many species have patterns of hair-like scales.

== Species ==
The Global Biodiversity Information Facility lists:

1. Paragymnopleurus ambiguus Janssens, 1945
2. Paragymnopleurus brahminus (Waterhouse, 1890)
3. Paragymnopleurus martinezi (Balthasar, 1955)
4. Paragymnopleurus maurus (Sharp, 1875)
5. Paragymnopleurus melanarius (von Harold, 1867)
6. Paragymnopleurus planus (Sharp, 1875)
7. Paragymnopleurus rudis (Sharp, 1875)
8. Paragymnopleurus sinuatus (Olivier, 1789)
9. Paragymnopleurus sparsus (Sharp, 1875)
10. Paragymnopleurus spinotus Boucomont, 1914
11. Paragymnopleurus stipes (Sharp, 1875)
12. Paragymnopleurus striatus (Sharp, 1875)
13. Paragymnopleurus sumatrensis Ochi & Kon, 1997
