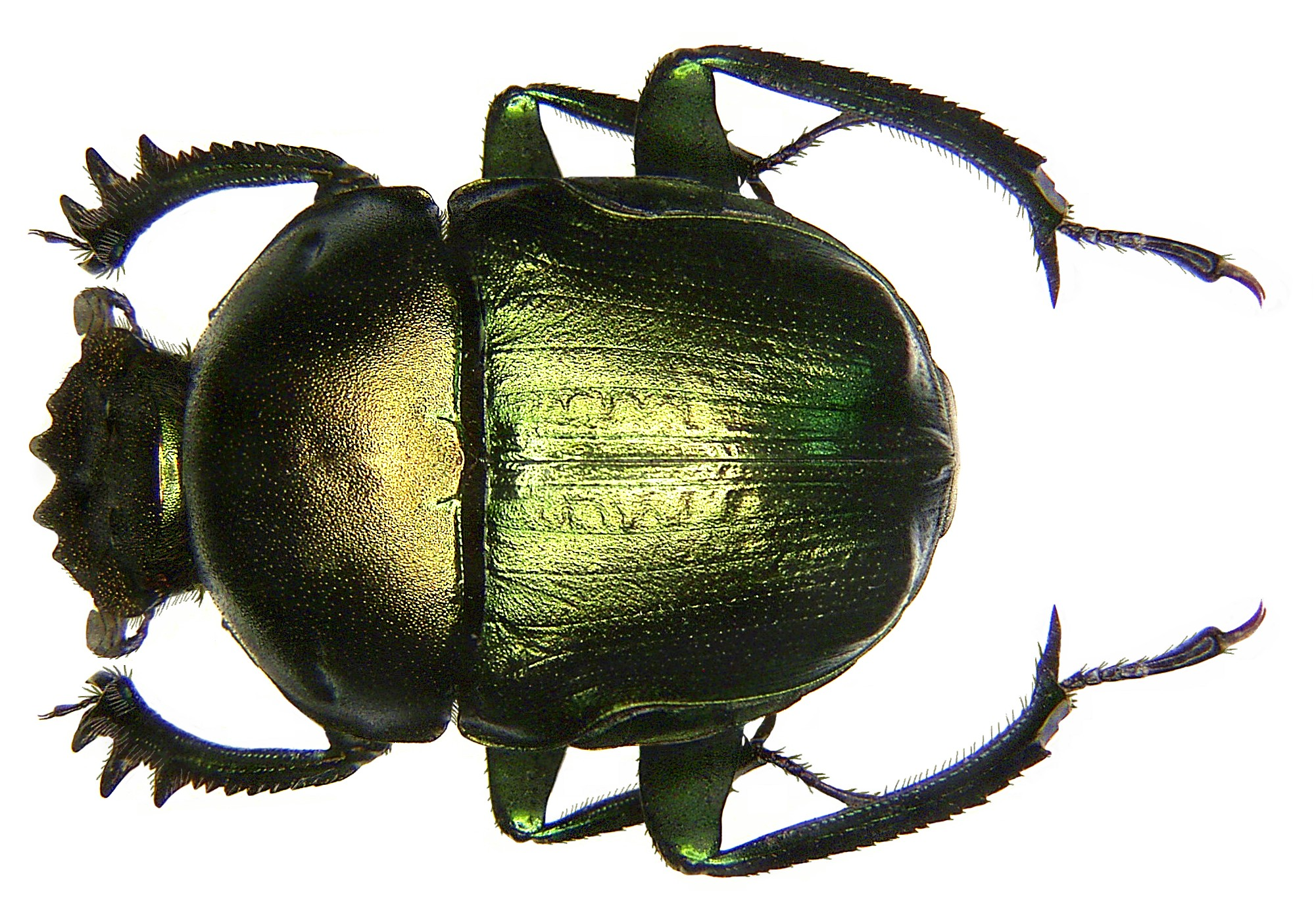
- Garreta nitens

Scientific classification
- Domain: Eukaryota
- Kingdom: Animalia
- Phylum: Arthropoda
- Class: Insecta
- Order: Coleoptera
- Suborder: Polyphaga
- Infraorder: Scarabaeiformia
- Family: Scarabaeidae
- Subfamily: Scarabaeinae
- Tribe: Gymnopleurini
- Genus: Garreta; Janssens, 1940

= Garreta =

Genus of beetles

Garreta is a genus of dung beetles (subfamily Scarabaeinae) in the scarab beetle family (Scarabaeidae). There are more than 20 described species; most are African and some are from Asia. They are generally found in fairly moist habitats (forest, moist savanna and upland grassland).

All species are ball-rolling dung beetles.

== Species ==
- Garreta australugens Davis & Deschodt, 2018
- Garreta azureus (Fabricius, 1801)
- Garreta basilewskyi (Balthasar, 1964)
- Garreta bechynei Pokorny & Zidek, 2018
- Garreta caffer (Fahraeus, 1857)
- Garreta crenulatus (Kolbe, 1895)
- Garreta dejeani (Castelnau, 1840)
- Garreta diffinis (Waterhouse, 1890)
- Garreta fastiditus (Harold, 1867)
- Garreta gilleti (Garreta, 1914)
- Garreta laetus (Hope, 1842)
- Garreta lugens (Fairmaire, 1891)
- Garreta malleolus (Kolbe, 1895)
- Garreta matabelensis (Janssens, 1938)
- Garreta mombelgi (Boucomont, 1929)
- Garreta morosus (Fairmaire, 1886)
- Garreta mundus (Wiedemann, 1819)
- Garreta namalugens Davis & Deschodt, 2018
- Garreta nitens (Olivier, 1789)
- Garreta nyassicus (Kolbe, 1897)
- Garreta opacus (Redtenbacher, 1848)
- Garreta ruficornis (Motschulsky, 1854)
- Garreta rutilans (Castelnau, 1840)
- Garreta smaragdifer (Walker, 1858)
- Garreta sumptuosus (Castelnau, 1840)
- Garreta sylvestris Mittal, 2011
- Garreta unicolor (Fahraeus, 1857)
- Garreta wahlbergi (Fahraeus, 1857)

== Gallery ==
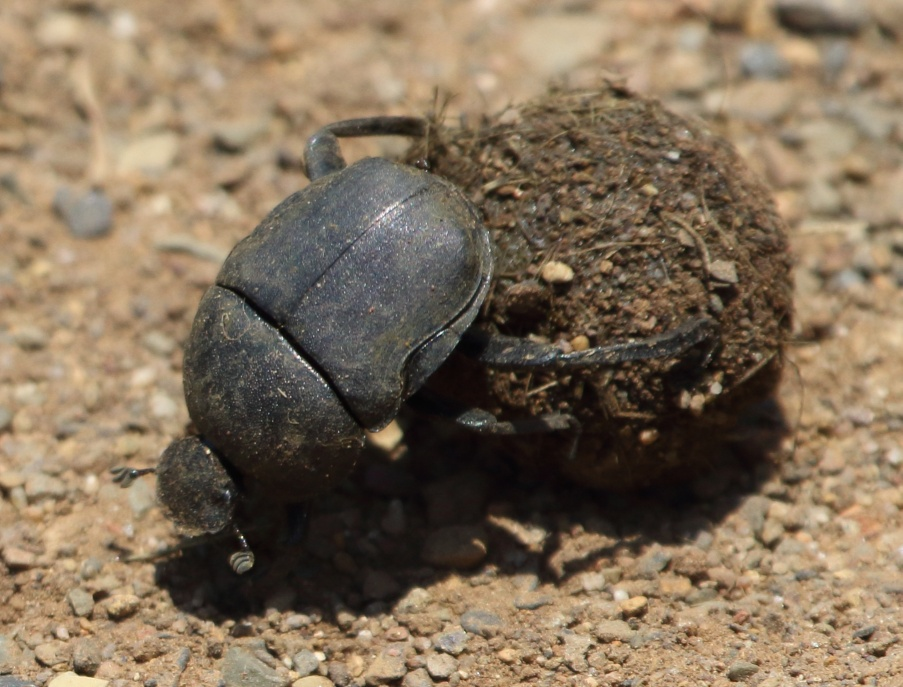
Garreta unicolor rolling a ball of rhinoceros dung in Ithala Game Reserve

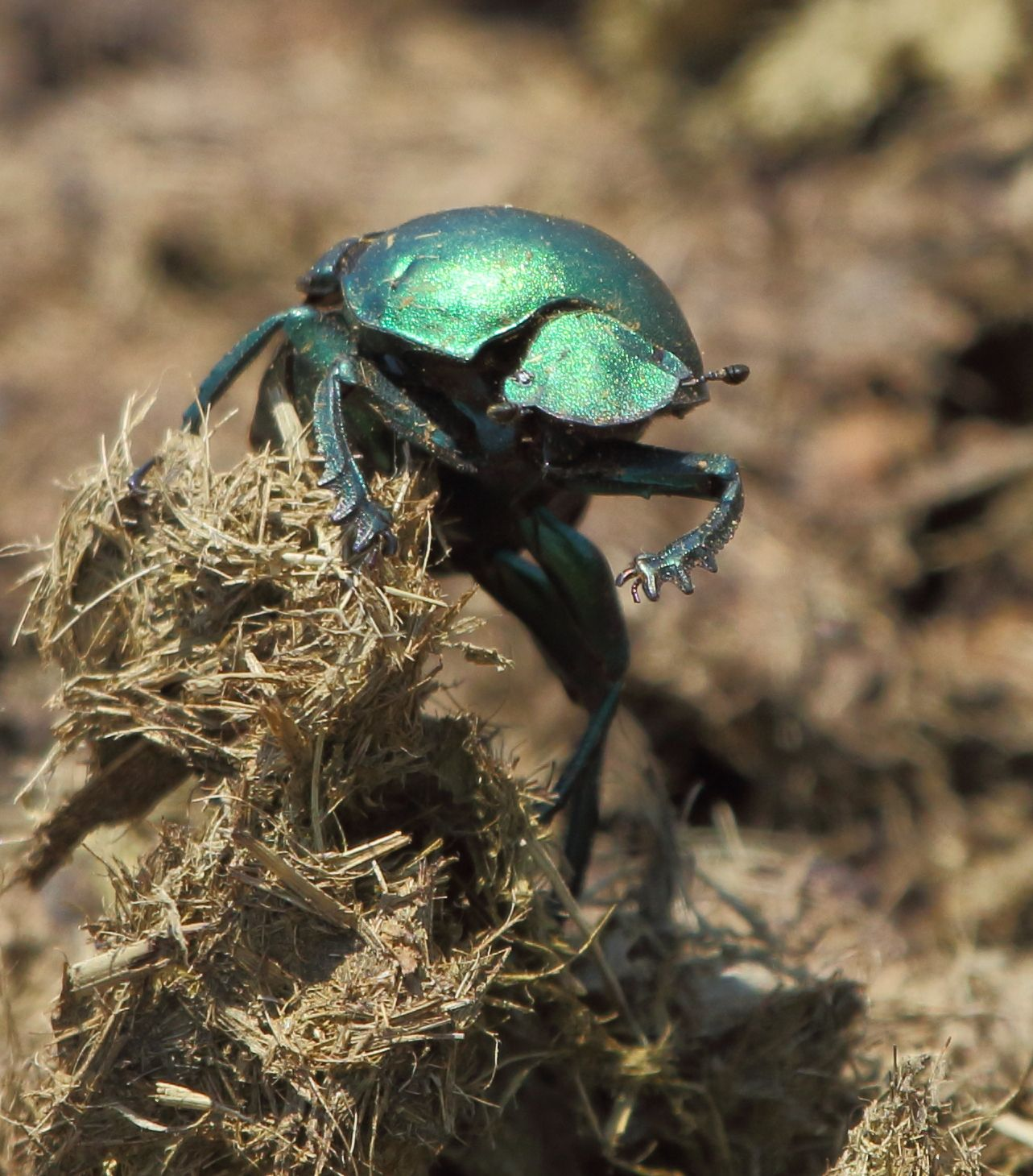
Garreta nitens
