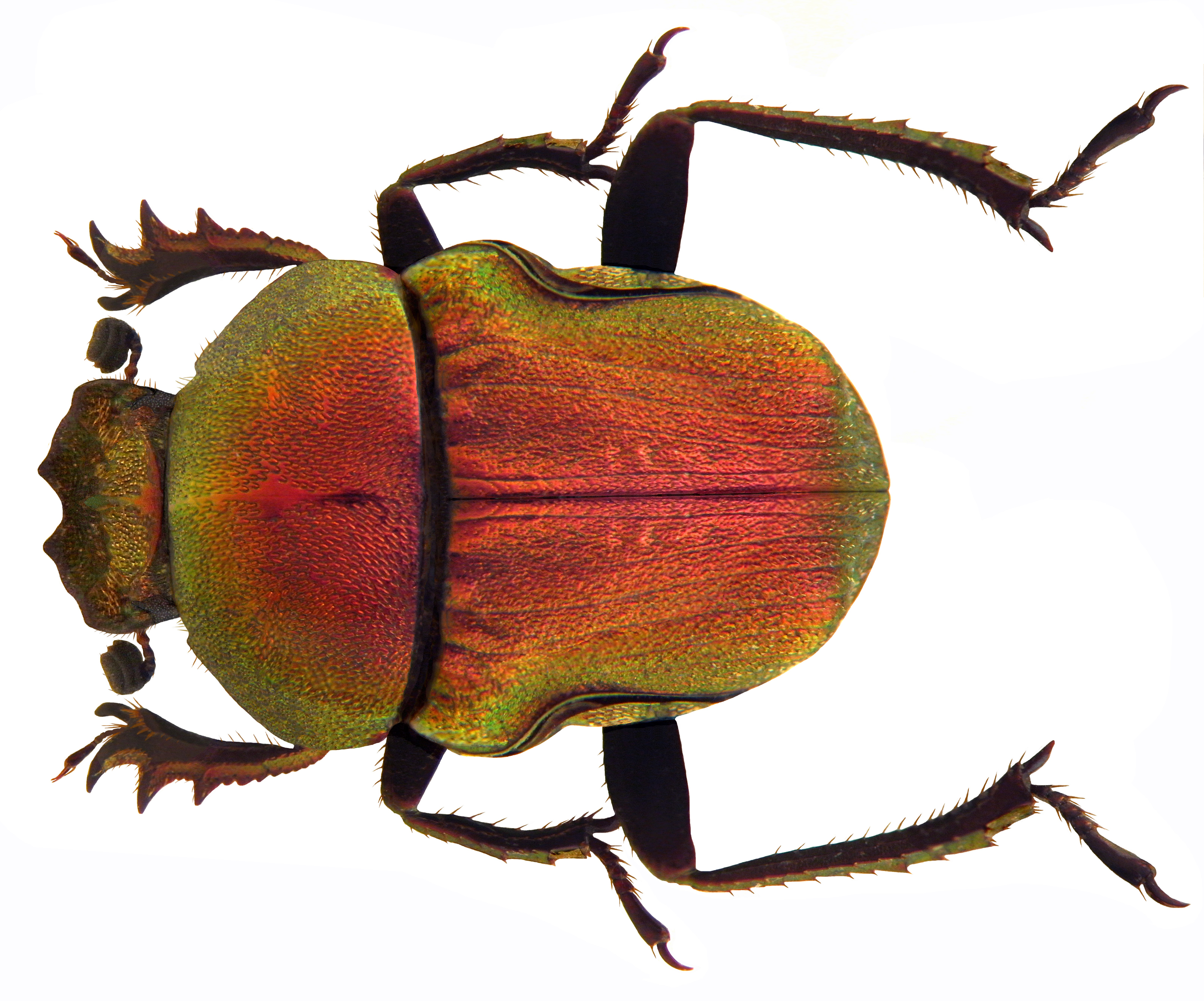
- Gymnopleurus aenescens

Scientific classification
- Domain: Eukaryota
- Kingdom: Animalia
- Phylum: Arthropoda
- Class: Insecta
- Order: Coleoptera
- Suborder: Polyphaga
- Infraorder: Scarabaeiformia
- Family: Scarabaeidae
- Subfamily: Scarabaeinae
- Tribe: Gymnopleurini
- Genus: Gymnopleurus; Illiger, 1803

Synonyms
- Metagymnopleurus Kabakov, 2006; Spinigymnopleurus Shipp, 1897; Symnopleurus Gebler, 1841

= Gymnopleurus =

Genus of beetles

Gymnopleurus is a genus of Scarabaeidae or dung beetles in the superfamily Scarabaeoidea.

== Species ==
- Gymnopleurus aciculatus Gebler, 1841
- Gymnopleurus aenescens Wiedemann, 1821
- Gymnopleurus aeruginosus Harold, 1867
- Gymnopleurus andreaei Ferreira, 1954
- Gymnopleurus asperrimus Felsche, 1909
- Gymnopleurus atratus Klug, 1845
- Gymnopleurus bicallosus Felsche, 1909
- Gymnopleurus bicolor Latreille, 1823
- Gymnopleurus biharensis Arrow, 1931
- Gymnopleurus bombayensis Arrow, 1931
- Gymnopleurus coerulescens (Olivier, 1789)
- Gymnopleurus colmanti Janssens, 1938
- Gymnopleurus cyaneus (Fabricius, 1798)
- Gymnopleurus deperditus Heer, 1862
- Gymnopleurus elegans Klug, 1845
- Gymnopleurus eocaenicus Meunier, 1921
- Gymnopleurus flagellatus (Fabricius, 1787)
- Gymnopleurus foricarius Garreta, 1914
- Gymnopleurus fulgidus (Olivier, 1789)
- Gymnopleurus gemmatus (Harold, 1871)
- Gymnopleurus geoffroyi (Fuessly, 1775)
- Gymnopleurus humanus MacLeay, 1821
- Gymnopleurus humeralis Klug, 1855
- Gymnopleurus hypocrita Balthasar, 1960
- Gymnopleurus ignitus Klug, 1855
- Gymnopleurus imitator Balthasar, 1963
- Gymnopleurus jacksoni Waterhouse, 1890
- Gymnopleurus koenigi (Fabricius, 1775)
- Gymnopleurus lacunosus Klug, 1845
- Gymnopleurus laevicollis Castelnau, 1840
- Gymnopleurus latreillei Castelnau, 1840
- Gymnopleurus leei (Fabricius, 1792)
- Gymnopleurus miliaris (Fabricius, 1775)
- Gymnopleurus mimus Balthasar, 1934
- Gymnopleurus moerens Kolbe, 1895
- Gymnopleurus mopsus (Pallas, 1781)
- Gymnopleurus naviauxi Montreuil, 2009
- Gymnopleurus nyankpalaensis Endrödi, 1976
- Gymnopleurus particolor Davis, 1986
- Gymnopleurus parvus MacLeay, 1821
- Gymnopleurus persianus Reitter, 1909
- Gymnopleurus plicatulus Fairmaire, 1890
- Gymnopleurus profanus (Fabricius, 1792)
- Gymnopleurus puncticollis Gillet, 1909
- Gymnopleurus purpureus Garreta, 1914
- Gymnopleurus pustulatus Kolbe, 1895
- Gymnopleurus qurosh Montreuil, 2011
- Gymnopleurus reichei Waterhouse, 1890
- Gymnopleurus rhodesianus Balthasar, 1963
- Gymnopleurus rotundatus Heer, 1862
- Gymnopleurus ruandensis Janssens, 1938
- Gymnopleurus sericeifrons Fairmaire, 1887
- Gymnopleurus sindensis Arrow, 1931
- Gymnopleurus sisyphus Heer, 1847
- Gymnopleurus somaliensis Lansberge, 1882
- Gymnopleurus sturmi MacLeay, 1821
- Gymnopleurus thelwalli Waterhouse, 1890
- Gymnopleurus thoracicus Harold, 1868
- Gymnopleurus tristis Castelnau, 1840
- Gymnopleurus tuxeni Petrovitz, 1955
- Gymnopleurus virens Erichson, 1843

== Gallery ==
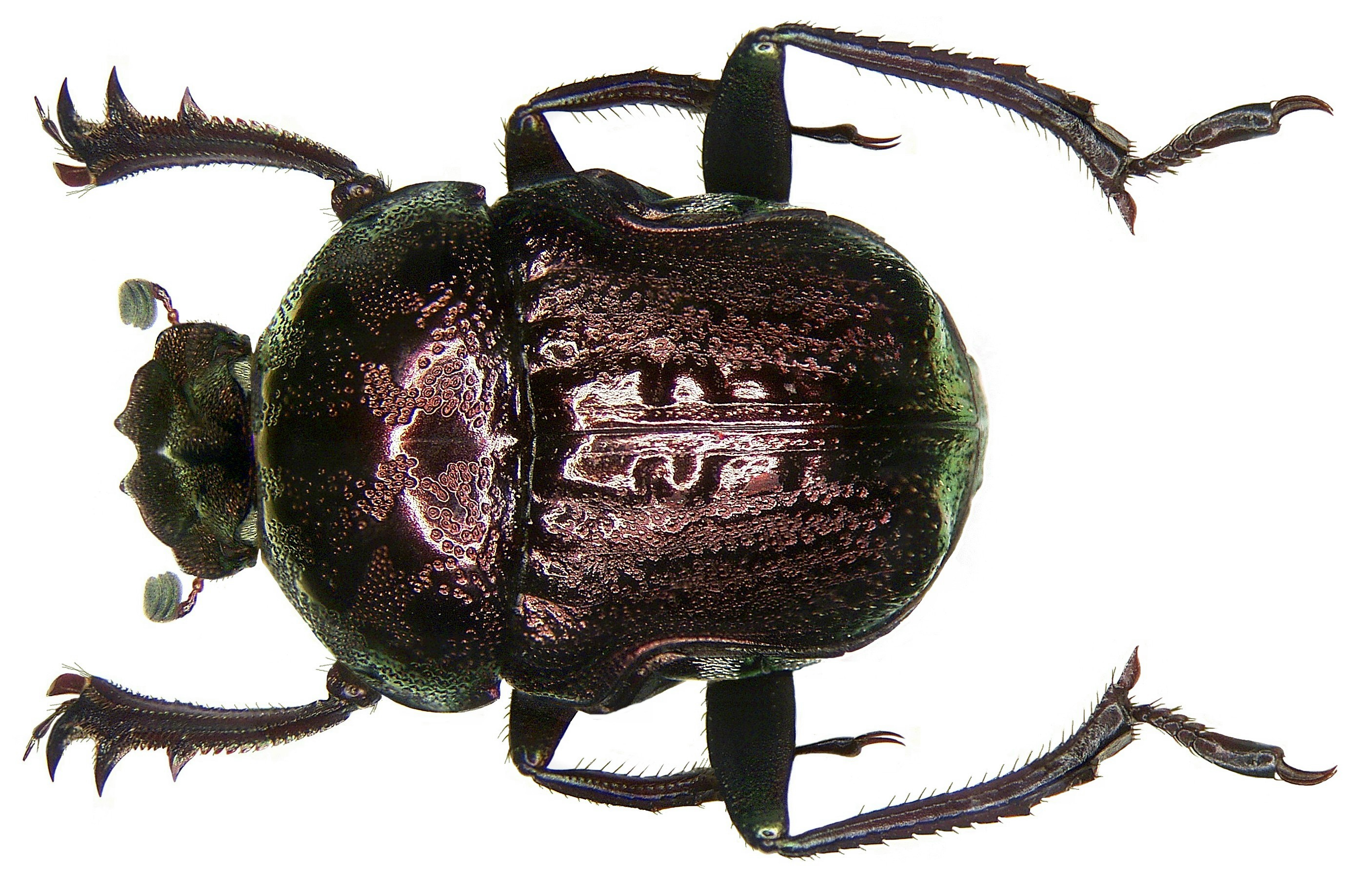
Gymnopleurus fulgidus

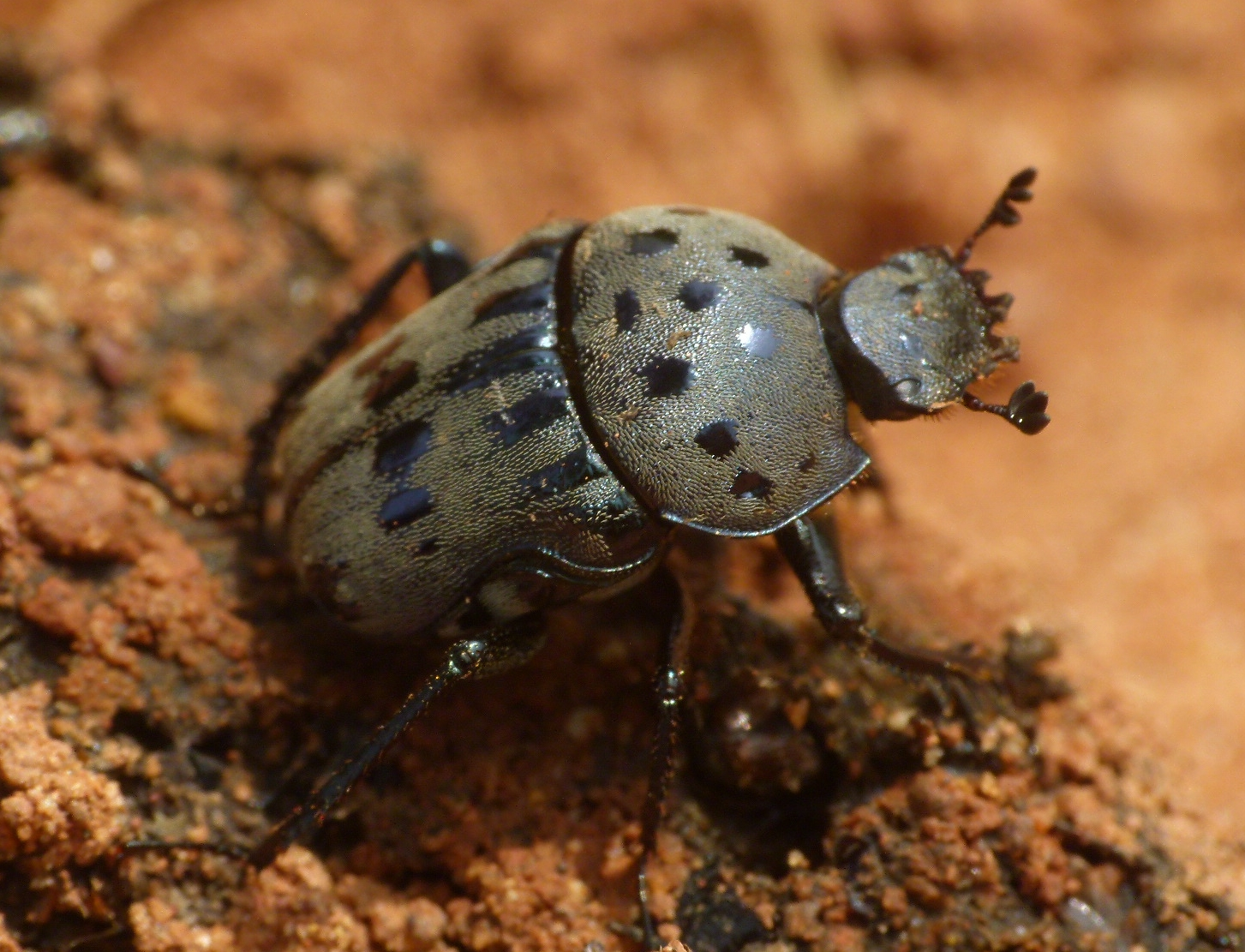
Gymnopleurus miliaris

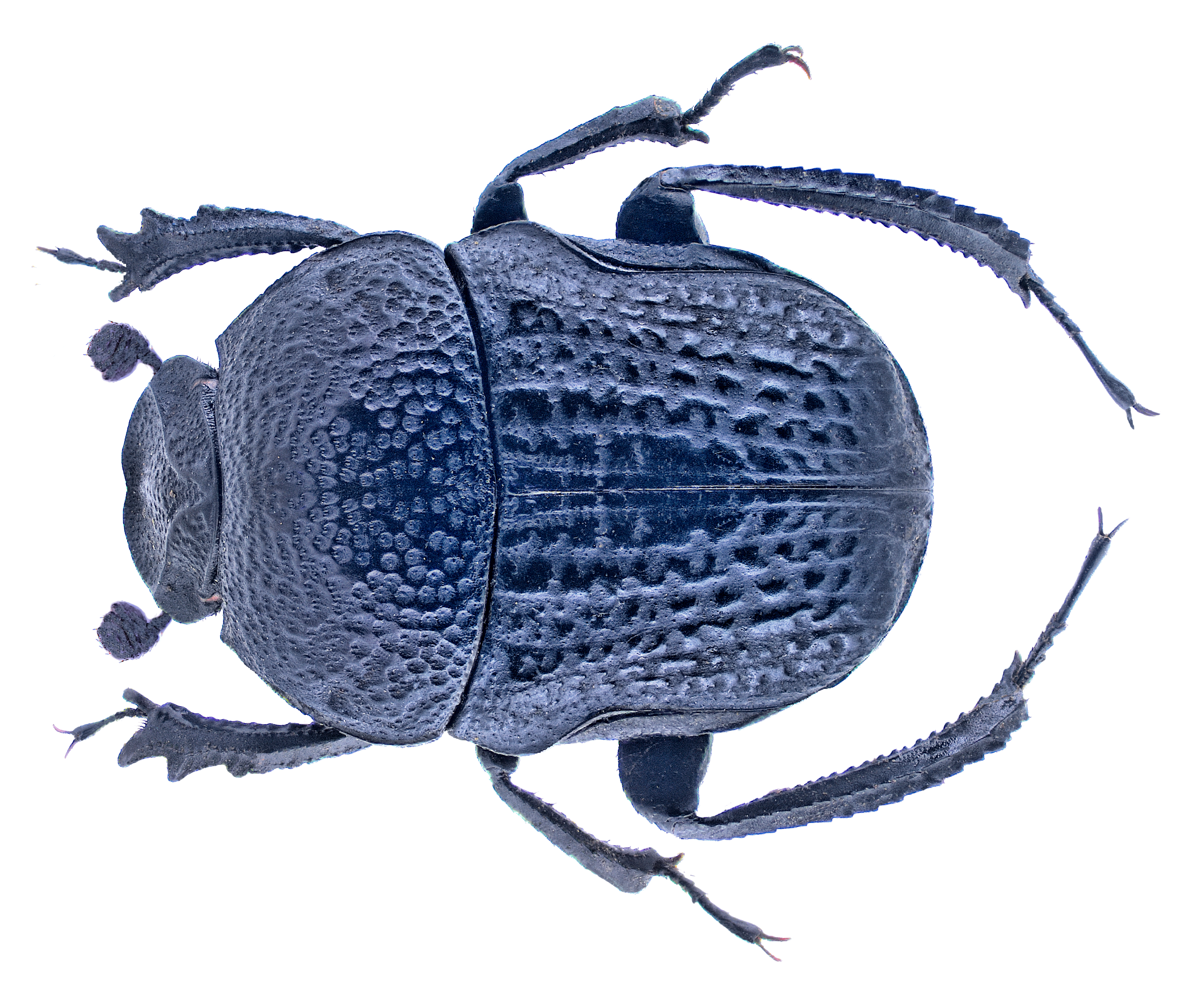
Gymnopleurus qurosh

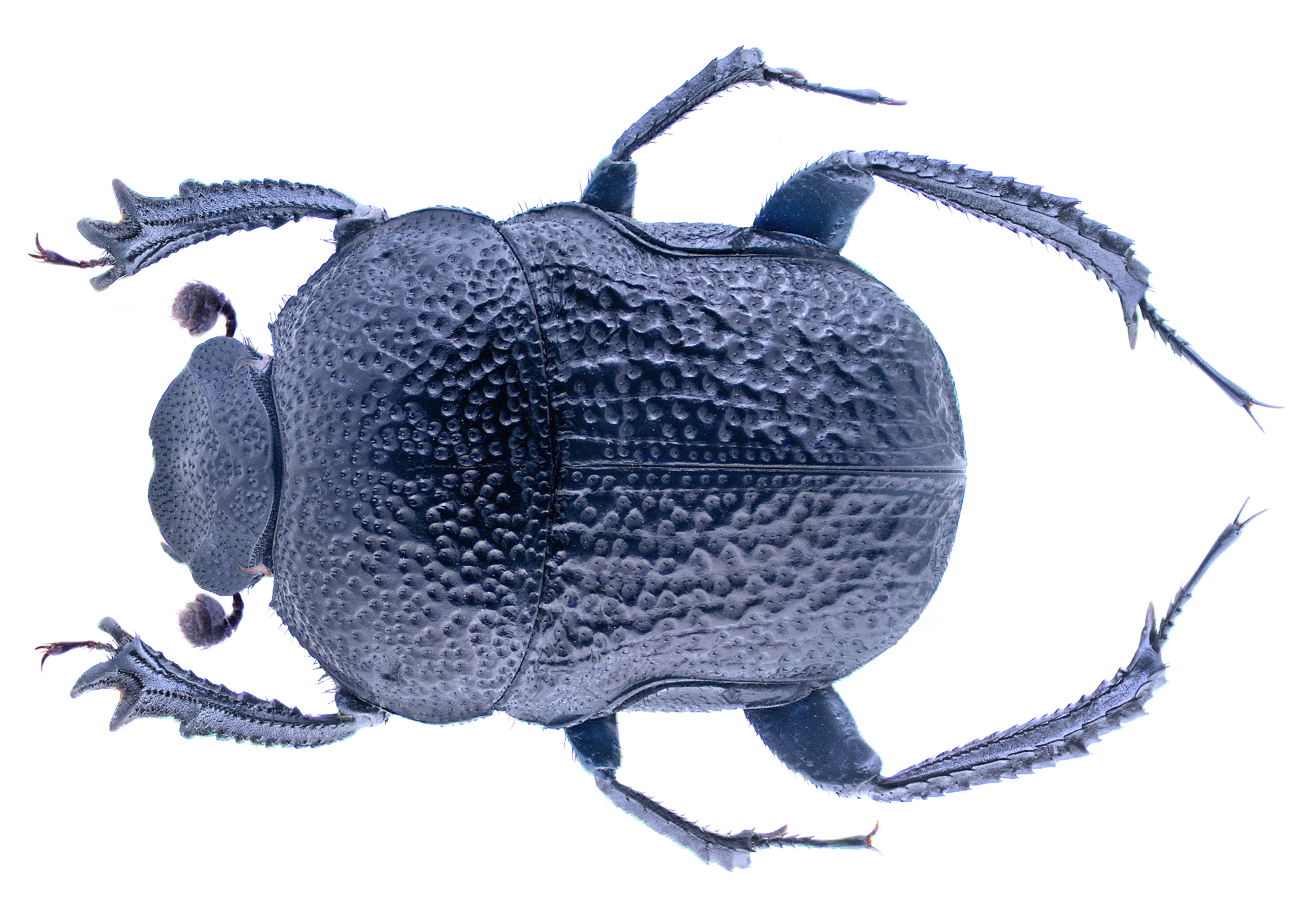
Gymnopleurus geoffroyi

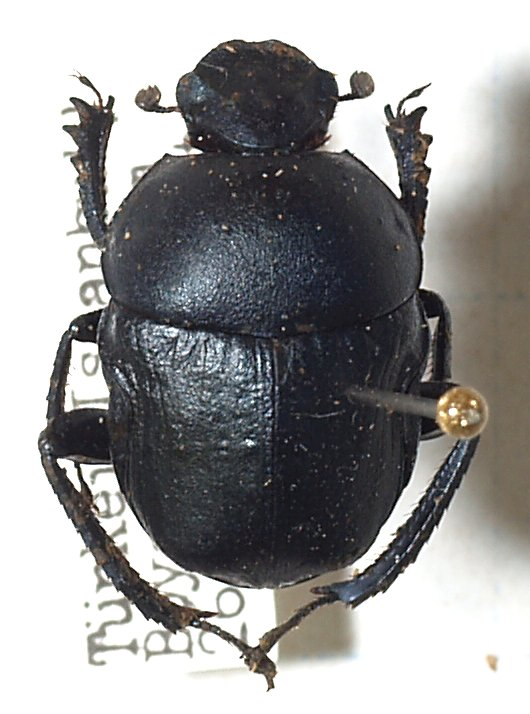
Gymnopleurus sturmi

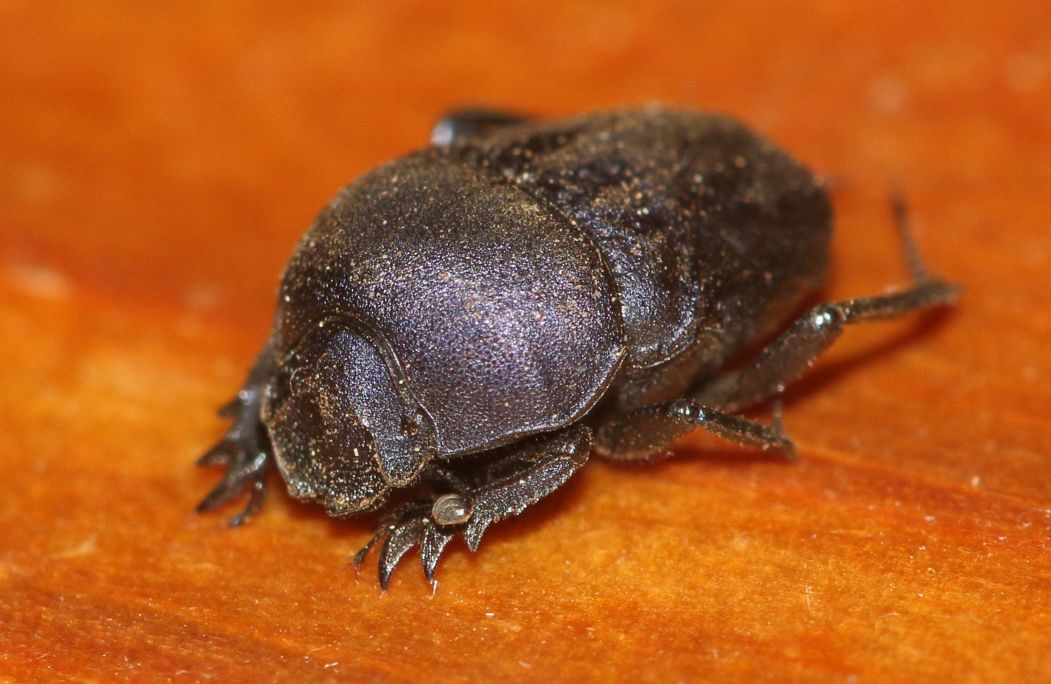
Gymnopleurus asperrimus

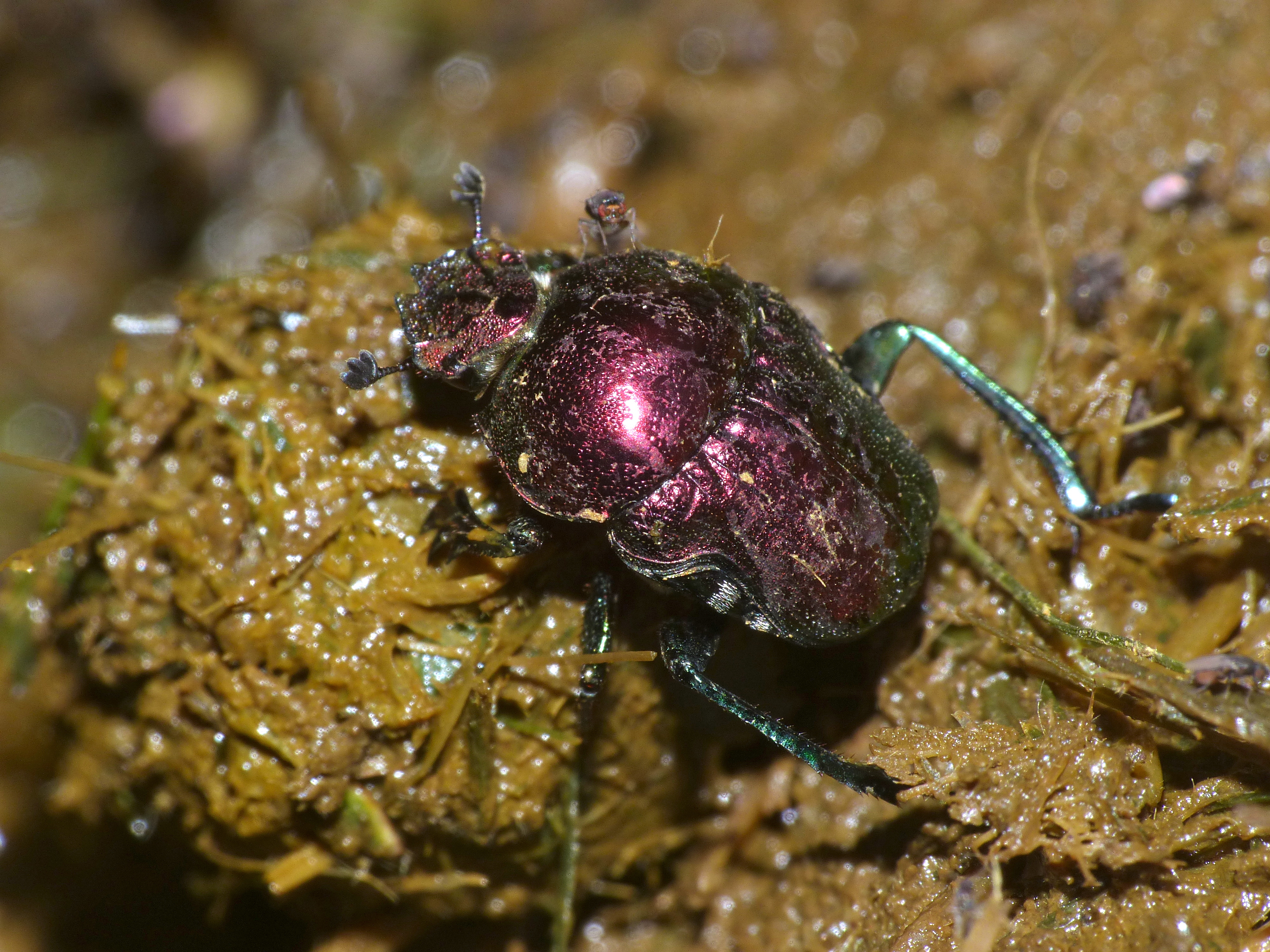
Gymnopleurus virens

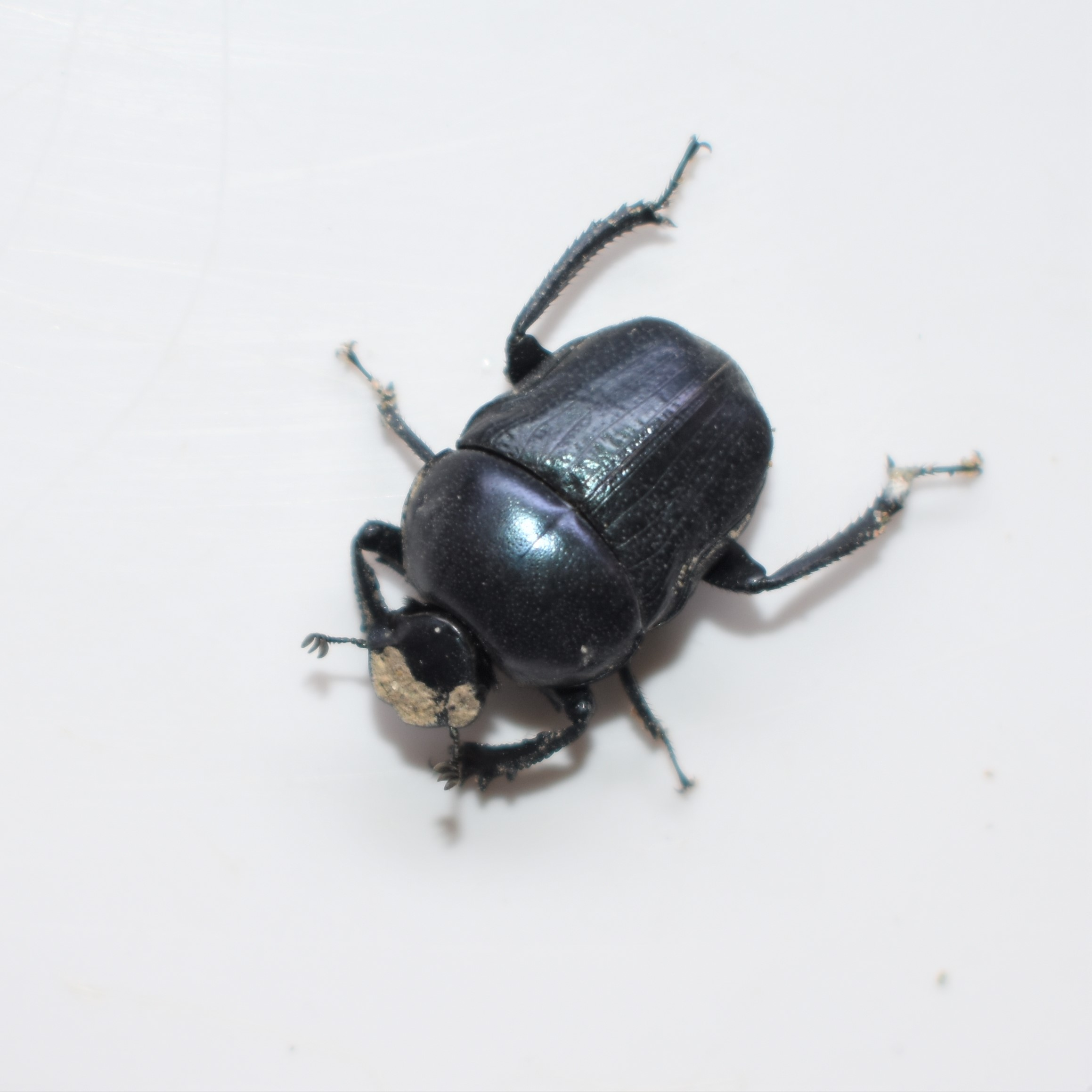
Gymnopleurus mopsus

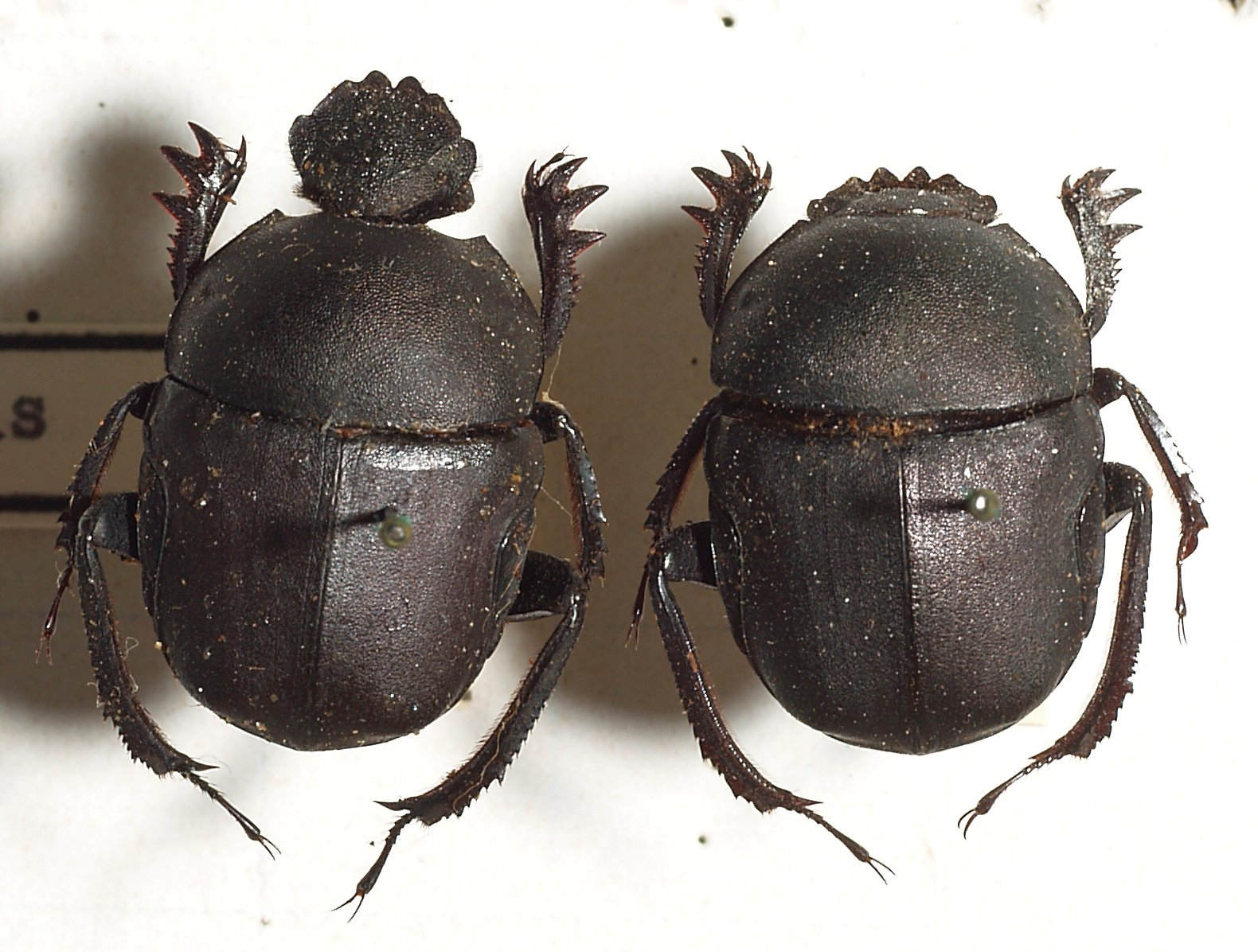
Gymnopleurus capensis

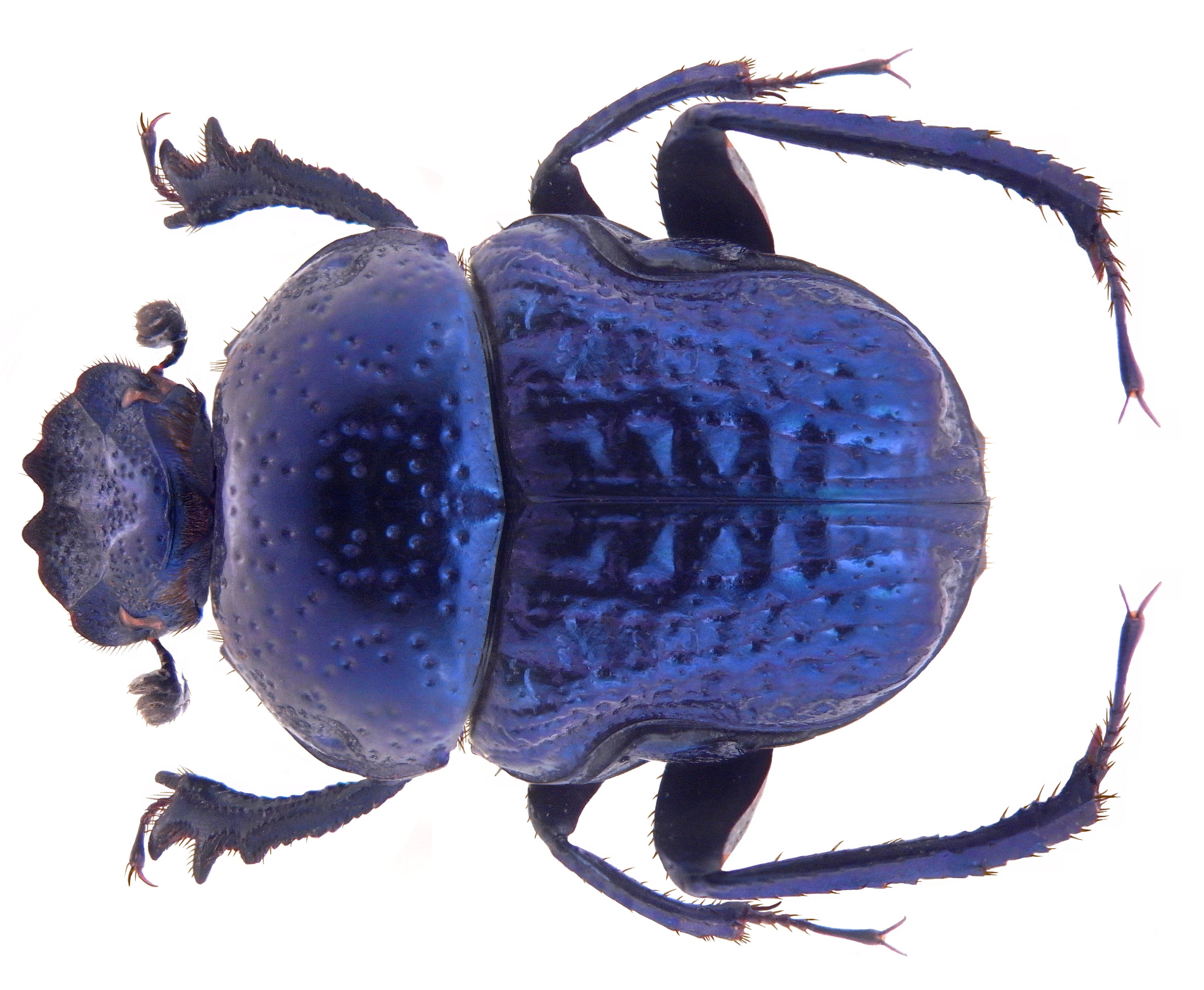
Gymnopleurus cyaneus

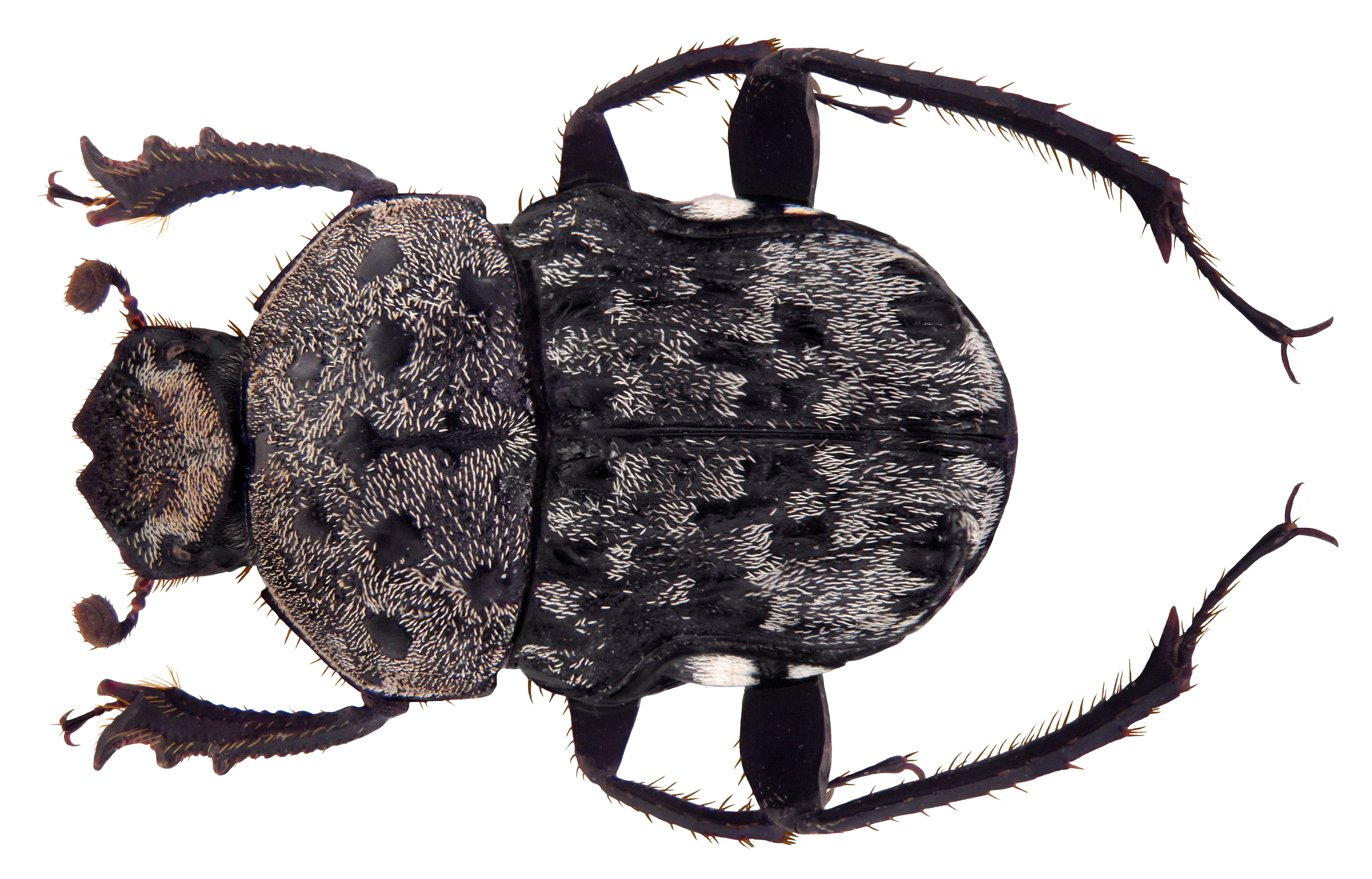
Gymnopleurus gemmatus
