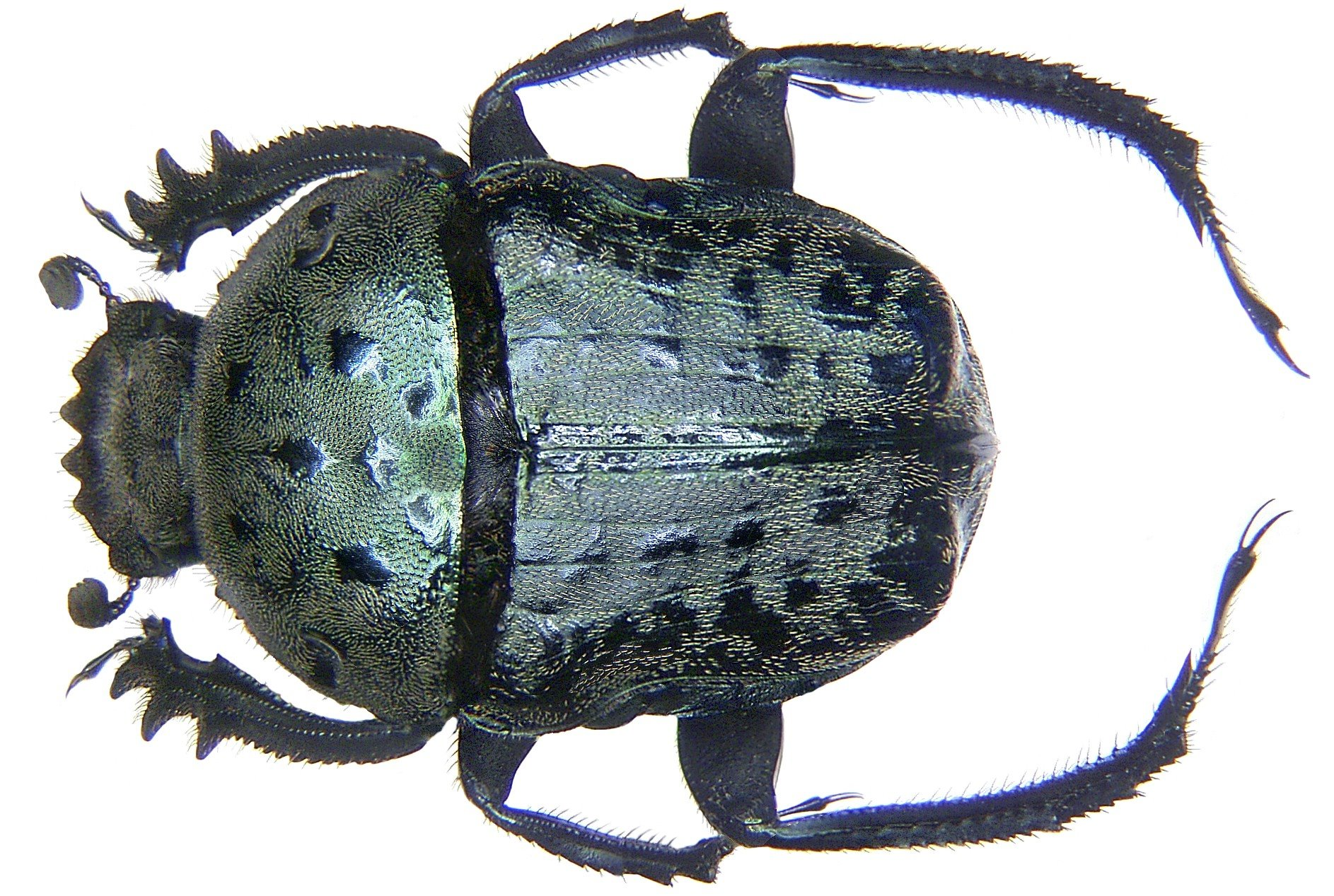
- Allogymnopleurus maculosus

Scientific classification
- Domain: Eukaryota
- Kingdom: Animalia
- Phylum: Arthropoda
- Class: Insecta
- Order: Coleoptera
- Suborder: Polyphaga
- Infraorder: Scarabaeiformia
- Family: Scarabaeidae
- Subfamily: Scarabaeinae
- Tribe: Gymnopleurini
- Genus: Allogymnopleurus; Janssens, 1940

= Allogymnopleurus =

Genus of beetles

Allogymnopleurus is a genus of scarab beetles in the tribe Gymnopleurini. It includes 20 species; 17 are restricted to the Afrotropics, one is Afrotropical/Palearctic, and two Oriental.

== Characters ==
These include:

- A suture where the thorax joins the abdomen which is clearly visible (from above) at the edge of the elytra
- A single terminal spur on each mesotibia
- The anterior edge of the clypeus is quadridentate or sexdentate (four or six teeth on the front edge of the head)
- Length ranges from 8.1 to 18.2 mm

== Gallery ==
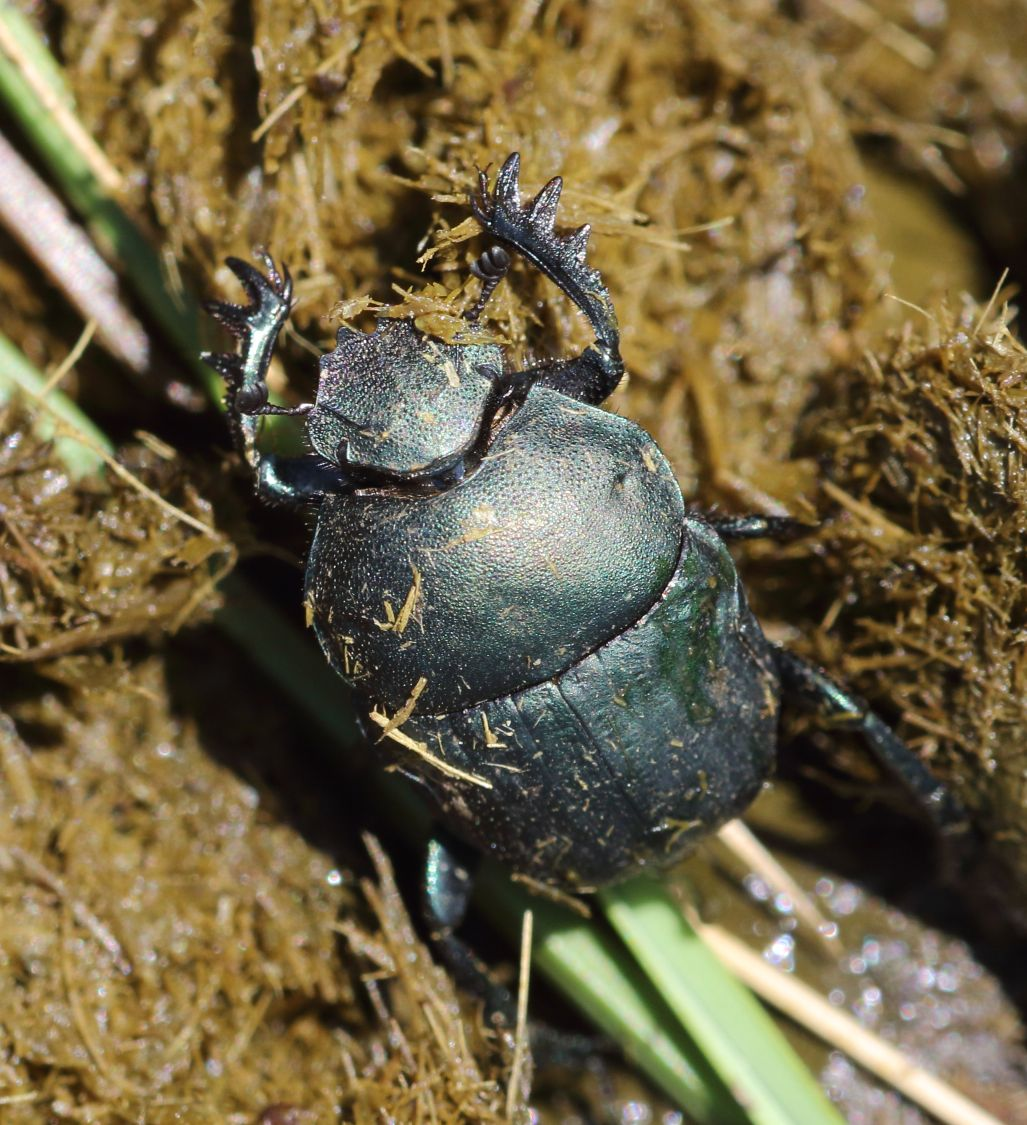
Allogymnopleurus thalassinus on zebra dung
