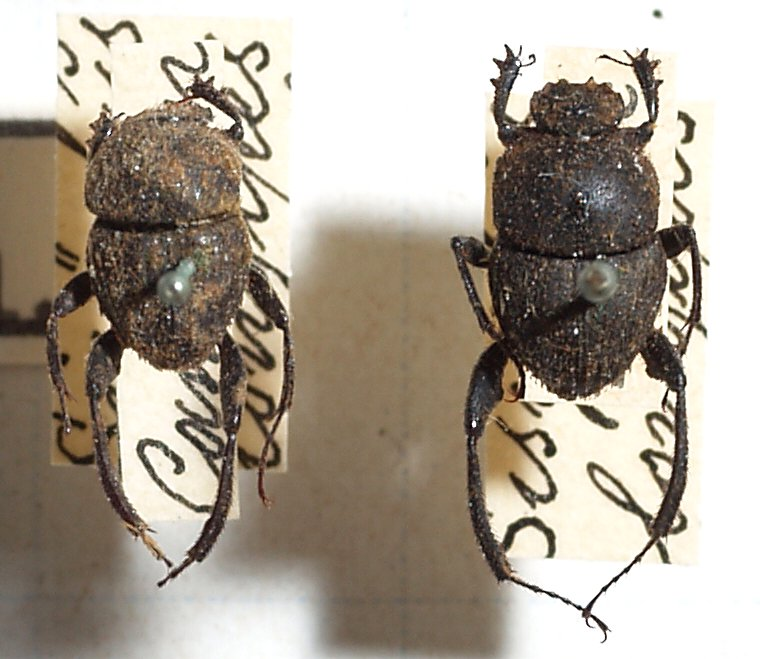
- Sisyphus longipes

Scientific classification
- Kingdom: Animalia
- Phylum: Arthropoda
- Clade: Pancrustacea
- Class: Insecta
- Order: Coleoptera
- Suborder: Polyphaga
- Infraorder: Scarabaeiformia
- Family: Scarabaeidae
- Tribe: Scarabaeini
- Genus: Sisyphus; Latreille, 1807

Species
- see text

= Sisyphus (beetle) =

Genus of beetles

Sisyphus is a genus of dung beetles comprising more than 90 species. Adults are characterised by their long hind legs.

== Etymology ==
The genus is named after Sisyphus, a mortal in Greek mythology who was condemned to the task of rolling a boulder up a hill for eternity.

== Distribution ==
Africa, Eurasia, Asia, Central America and Australia.

== Habits ==
Adults separate balls of dung from droppings and roll them some distance over the soil surface before burying them. Eggs are laid in the buried dung; this provides a source of food for the larvae once they hatch.

== Species ==
One common species is Sisyphus schaefferi (Linnaeus, 1758).
