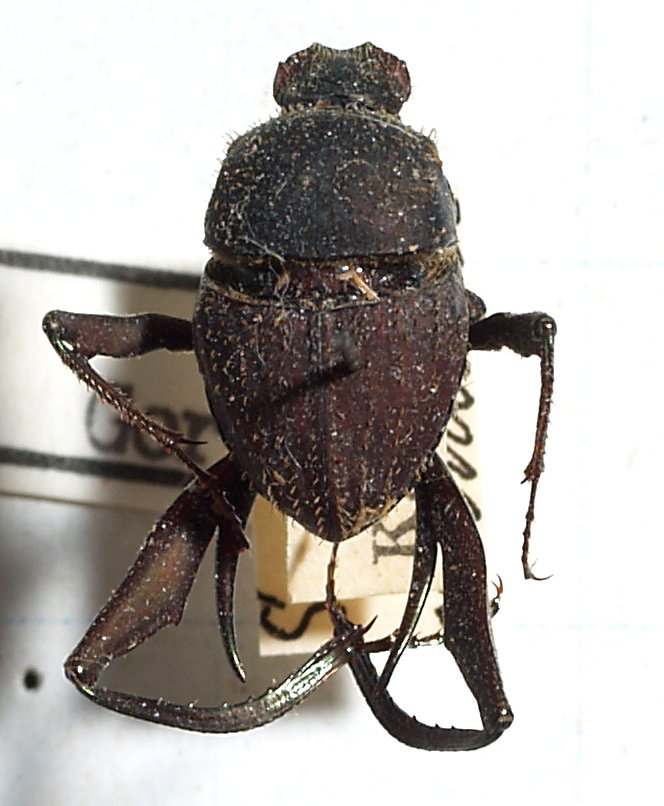
- Neosisyphus armatus

Scientific classification
- Kingdom: Animalia
- Phylum: Arthropoda
- Clade: Pancrustacea
- Class: Insecta
- Order: Coleoptera
- Suborder: Polyphaga
- Infraorder: Scarabaeiformia
- Family: Scarabaeidae
- Subfamily: Scarabaeinae
- Genus: Neosisyphus; Müller, 1942

= Neosisyphus =

Genus of beetles

Neosisyphus is a genus of Scarabaeidae or scarab beetles in the superfamily Scarabaeoidea.

== Species ==
- Neosisyphus angulicollis Felsche, 1909
- Neosisyphus astriatus Schafer & Fischer, 2001
- Neosisyphus baoule Cambefort, 1984
- Neosisyphus basilewskyi Haaf, 1956
- Neosisyphus bowringi White, 1844
- Neosisyphus confrater Kolbe, 1914
- Neosisyphus fortuitus Péringuey, 1901
- Neosisyphus gladiator Arrow, 1927
- Neosisyphus infuscatus Klug, 1855
- Neosisyphus kuehni Haaf, 1955
- Neosisyphus macrorubrus Paschalidis, 1974
- Neosisyphus paschalidisae Cambefort, 1984
- Neosisyphus penicillatus Harold, 1880
- Neosisyphus quadricollis Gory, 1833
- Neosisyphus rubripes Péringuey, 1901
- Neosisyphus rubrus Paschalidis, 1974
- Neosisyphus rugosus Gory, 1833
- Neosisyphus spinipes Thunberg, 1818
- Neosisyphus tai Cambefort, 1984
- Neosisyphus tarantula Arrow, 1909
- Neosisyphus tibialis Raffray, 1877
