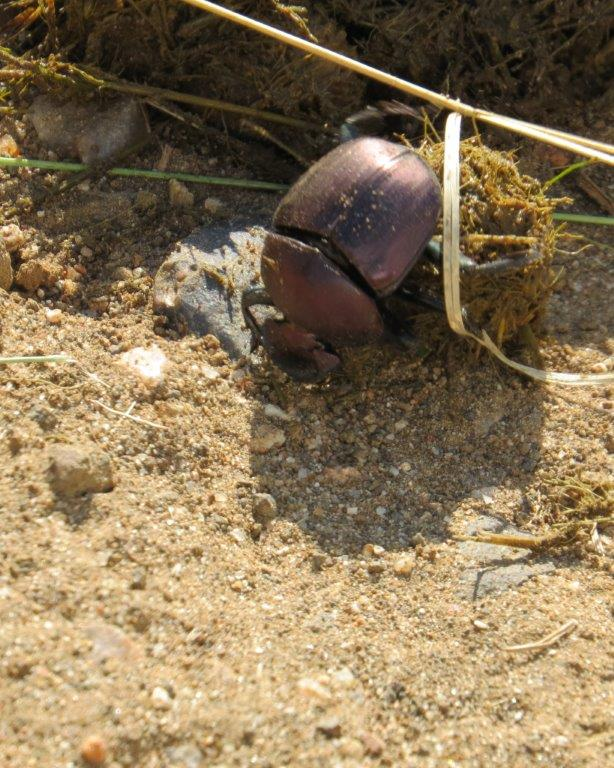
- Kheper nigroaeneus in South Africa

Scientific classification
- Domain: Eukaryota
- Kingdom: Animalia
- Phylum: Arthropoda
- Class: Insecta
- Order: Coleoptera
- Suborder: Polyphaga
- Infraorder: Scarabaeiformia
- Family: Scarabaeidae
- Genus: Scarabaeus
- Subgenus: Kheper; Janssens, 1940

= Kheper =

Genus of beetles

Kheper is a subgenus of Scarabaeus: the typical genus of scarab beetles in the tribe Scarabaeini. The genus name honors the god Khepri in the ancient Egyptian religion, who is depicted as having a scarab for a head. Kheper can be found on the border between Botswana, Namibia, and South Africa in the arid sand dunes. This genus of scarab beetles share a family with the oldest and most revered scarab beetles, the Scarabaeus sacer.
