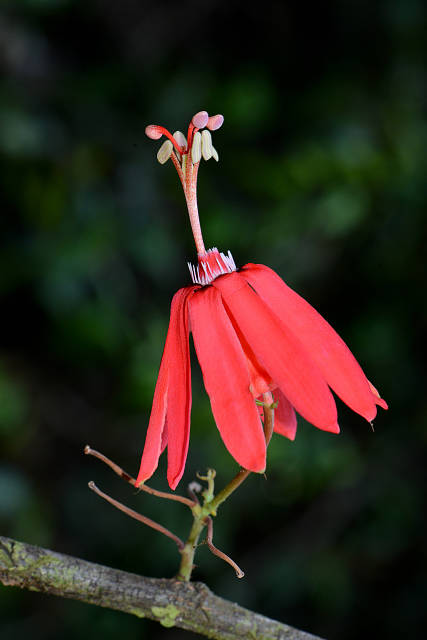

Scientific classification
- Kingdom: Plantae
- Clade: Tracheophytes
- Clade: Angiosperms
- Clade: Eudicots
- Clade: Rosids
- Order: Malpighiales
- Family: Passifloraceae
- Genus: Passiflora
- Species: P. glandulosa

Binomial name
- Passiflora glandulosa Cav.

Synonyms
- Distephana fockeana M.Roem.; Distephana glandulosa (Cav.) Juss. ex M.Roem.; Distephana glandulosa var. canaliculata (Juss.) M.Roem.; Distephana rohriana M.Roem.; Distephana stoupyana M.Roem.; Passiflora glandulosa var. canaliculata (Juss.) Mast.; Passiflora glandulosa var. stoupyana (DC.) Mast.; Passiflora imthurnii Mast.; Passiflora silvicola Barb.Rodr.; Tacsonia canaliculata Juss.; Tacsonia fockeana Miq.; Tacsonia glandulosa (Cav.) Juss.; Tacsonia glandulosa var. canaliculata (Juss.) DC.; Tacsonia rohriana DC.; Tacsonia stoupyana DC.; Tacsonia subcoriacea Garcke

= Passiflora glandulosa =

Plant species

Passiflora glandulosa, more commonly known as wild passion fruit, is a short deciduous climbing plant with stems that can grow up to 20 m (66 ft) long. The genus Passiflora is known for its colorful flowers, which is also prominent in the glandulosa species. Named by Antonio José Cavanilles in 1790, Passiflora glandulosa is native to many regions of the northeast coast of South America, having a neotropic distribution. In specific, Passiflora glandulosa is heavily populated in Guyana, Suriname, Brazil and French Guiana.

== Description ==
=== Morphology ===
Passiflora glandulosa is a liana, climbing plant that grows over neighboring vegetation through its tendrils. The liana classification of plant growth categorizes this species as a long-stemmed vine which grows vertically. Its stems are cylindrical and woody, with smooth, oblong leaves that have rounded margins.

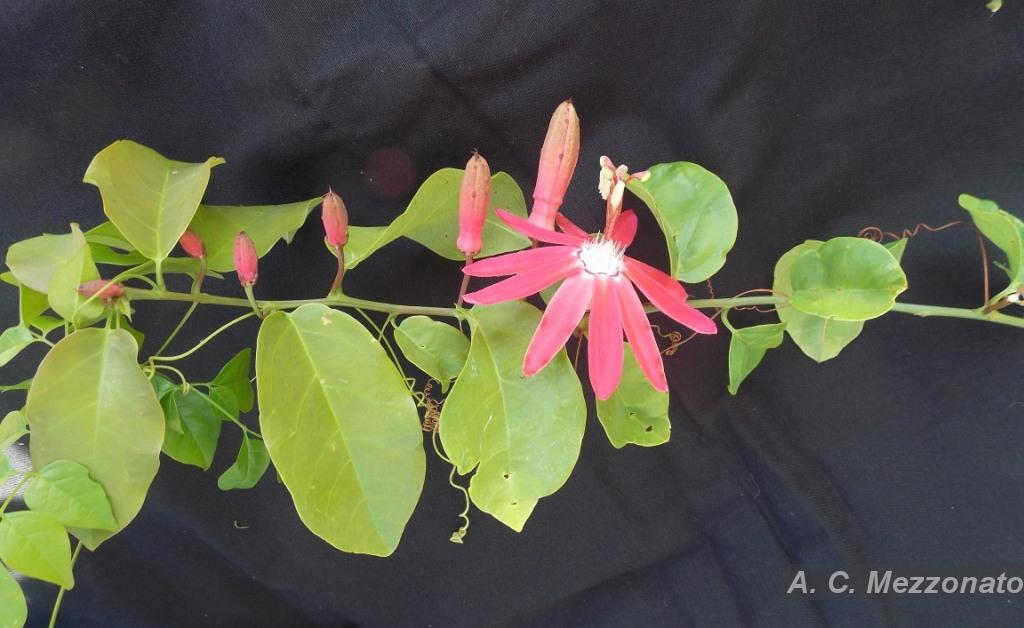
Branch of Passiflora glandulosa

=== Flowers and Fruit ===
Passiflora glandulosa have cauliflorous inflorescence, meaning the flowers grow directly from the plant's woody stems instead of from new shoots. Its petals are red or scarlet in color. The filament has both an external and internal component: the internal region ranges from 2–5 mm (0.079–0.197 in) long and is attached at its base. On the other hand, the external filament is awl-shaped and 100 mm (3.9 in) long, with a white to slightly pink color. As depicted below, fruit of the wild passion fruit has an ovoid shape. Fruits are high in vitamin C. As an indehiscent fruit, seeds are normally contained within the fruit unless disturbed by predation or decomposition. Passiflora glandulosa seeds are typically 4 mm × 8 mm (0.16 in × 0.31 in), obovate in shape, and reticulated.

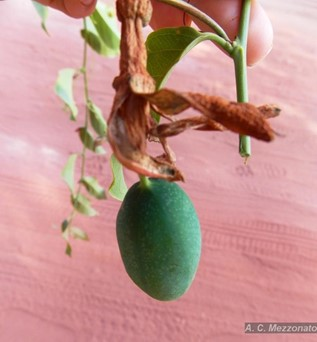

=== Extrafloral Nectaries ===
This species' flowers have extrafloral nectaries, wherein glands located on the leaf blade and petiole secrete nectar containing carbohydrates and amino acids. Extrafloral nectaries are not involved in pollination, and thus are implicated in the plant's defenses against herbivores by various researchers in the field. The morphology and anatomy of Passiflora glandulosa's extrafloral nectaries was studied and found to have the following characteristics. Its laminar extrafloral nectaries are on the leaf blade, shaped like a disc, and yellow in color. The petiole extrafloral nectaries occur in pairs and are covered by only a thin cuticle. The structural patterns of laminar extrafloral nectaries also were found in other species both within and outside of the family Passifloraceae, which has been found to be indicative of evolution by convergence.

== Distribution ==
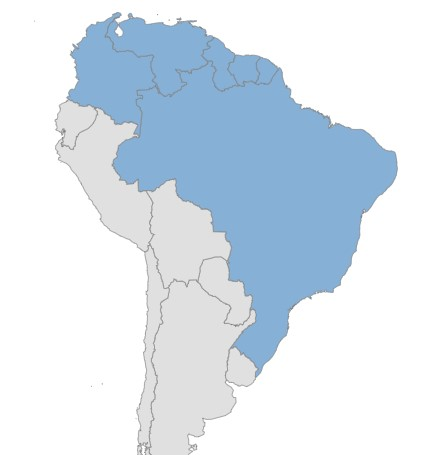
Distribution of Passiflora glandulosa by country in South America

As displayed in the map, this species is native to the northern region of South America, including: Venezuela, Guyana, French Guiana, Suriname, and Brazil. More specifically, Passiflora glandulosa in Brazil is located in its northern, northeast, and central-west regions, which include the following states:

- Acre
- Amazonas
- Amapá
- Pará
- Rondônia
- Roraima
- Tocantins
- Bahia
- Ceará
- Maranhão
- Paraíba
- Pernambuco
- Piauí
- Distrito Federal
- Goiás
- Mato Grosso

Passiflora glandulosa's conservation status is LC, meaning it is under "least concern," as it is still abundant in nature.

== Habitat and Ecology ==
As a plant abundant in the Amazon rainforest and the tropical region of South America, this species' habitat includes rainforests and secondary forests–they are reported to grow on roadsides, as well. Their microhabitat contains chrysobalanaceae, annonaceae, and red laterite soil.

=== Herbivory ===
Passiflora glandulosa have many predators, mainly being phytophagous insects. The herbivores responsible for the herbivory include: cockroaches, locusts, tettigoniids, crickets, chrysomelid beetles (Alticinae), and leaf-cutting ants of the genera Atta and Acromyrmex. On top of this, butterflies also feed on Passiflora glandulosa, more specifically; Heliconius astraea, Heliconius egeria, Heliconius numata, and Heliconius melpomene. While there are numerous predators for Passiflora glandulosa, these plants also exhibit a very interesting relationship with specific ant species. Labeyrie et al. conducted a study which studied the protective role of four ant species on Passiflora glandulosa. Due to the extrafloral nectary (EFN) that is present on Passiflora glandulosa, this attracts specific ants, such as Camponotus femoratus, Crematogaster limata parabiotica, Camponotus blandus and Camponotus melanoticus. These ants are then able to protect the plant stem from the plant's predators. Ca. femoratus and Crematogaster limata parabiotica are able to share their territories and nests, while Ca. Blandus and Ca. melanoticus are diurnal and nocturnal, respectively. This behavior between Passiflora glandulosa's EFN and the four ant species listed previously provides an almost all around protection of Passiflora glandulosa from its predators.

== Uses ==
Passiflora glandulosa has a diverse variety of uses by the human population. Those include mainly medicinal and nutritional applications.

=== Food ===
Many of the fruits in the Passiflora genus are called passion fruit. For example, Passiflora edulis f. flavicarpa is more commonly known as yellow passion fruit and Passiflora alata is more commonly referred to as sweet passion fruit. While various passion fruits are consumed and commercialized, Passiflora glandulosa is in a gray area where industries are unable to determine if it is worth harvesting the specific wild passion fruit. This is due to the lack of antioxidant characteristic Passiflora glandulosa possesses: in other passion fruits, they contain high levels of polyphenols and flavonoids, which gives the passion fruit its antioxidant characteristic, but wild passion fruit has low levels of polyphenols, leading to lower antioxidant activity. While wild passion fruits may have lower antioxidant potential, one study done by Sousa et al. found that by isolating the pectin from fresh peels of the Passiflora glandulosa fruit, these had a hypoglycemic effect on diabetic mice. Not enough research has been conducted to find the true value of wild passion fruit, and so very little commercialization of this fruit has been made.

=== Medicinal ===
Different parts of the Passiflora glandulosa plant is used for a variety of medicinal purposes ranging from first aid, infections, and sexual health. In French Guiana during the time of the Republic of Suriname, the Maroon people would utilize a bark decoction from the Passiflora glandulosa plant to treat black skin worms, more commonly known as pinworms, an intestinal parasite. The stem was utilized by crushing and extracting the sap out of the stem to be used to create an eyewash to relieve conjunctivitis (pink eye), an infection in the eye. It was also observed to be used as an additive for curative herbal baths. The Patamona people in Brazil use the leaves to create an emollient for bruises, sores, and cuts, while the fruit was soaked in water to be used to make a tonic. The sap and rasped bark was also observed to be used to treat symptoms of gonorrhea and kidney stones, this was done by applying the sap onto the skin. The rasped bark would be placed inside the aperture of the male genitalia.

== Synonyms ==
Other known names for Passiflora glandulosa in their respective languages include:

- Wayapi: mulukuya
- Guyana Lokono: bimititokan
- Guyana Creole: passion flower
- Guyana Patamona: ka-wuk-raie-yik, ak-kour-mang-yik.
- Surinam Lokono: bimititokon jawoheme voekoejang
- Surinam Kalina: losaboto kalawiroe
- Surinam Creole: pomme-liane
- Surinam Paramaccan: marakoesja
- Surinam Saramaccan: jooka makodja, yooka makodja
- Surinam Sranan: bosch markoesa, markoesa, roode markoesa, wilde markoesa
- Surinam Tirio: ah-lah-kah a-nah-pe-do
- Surinam Wayana: ku-de-mow ah-mo-me
