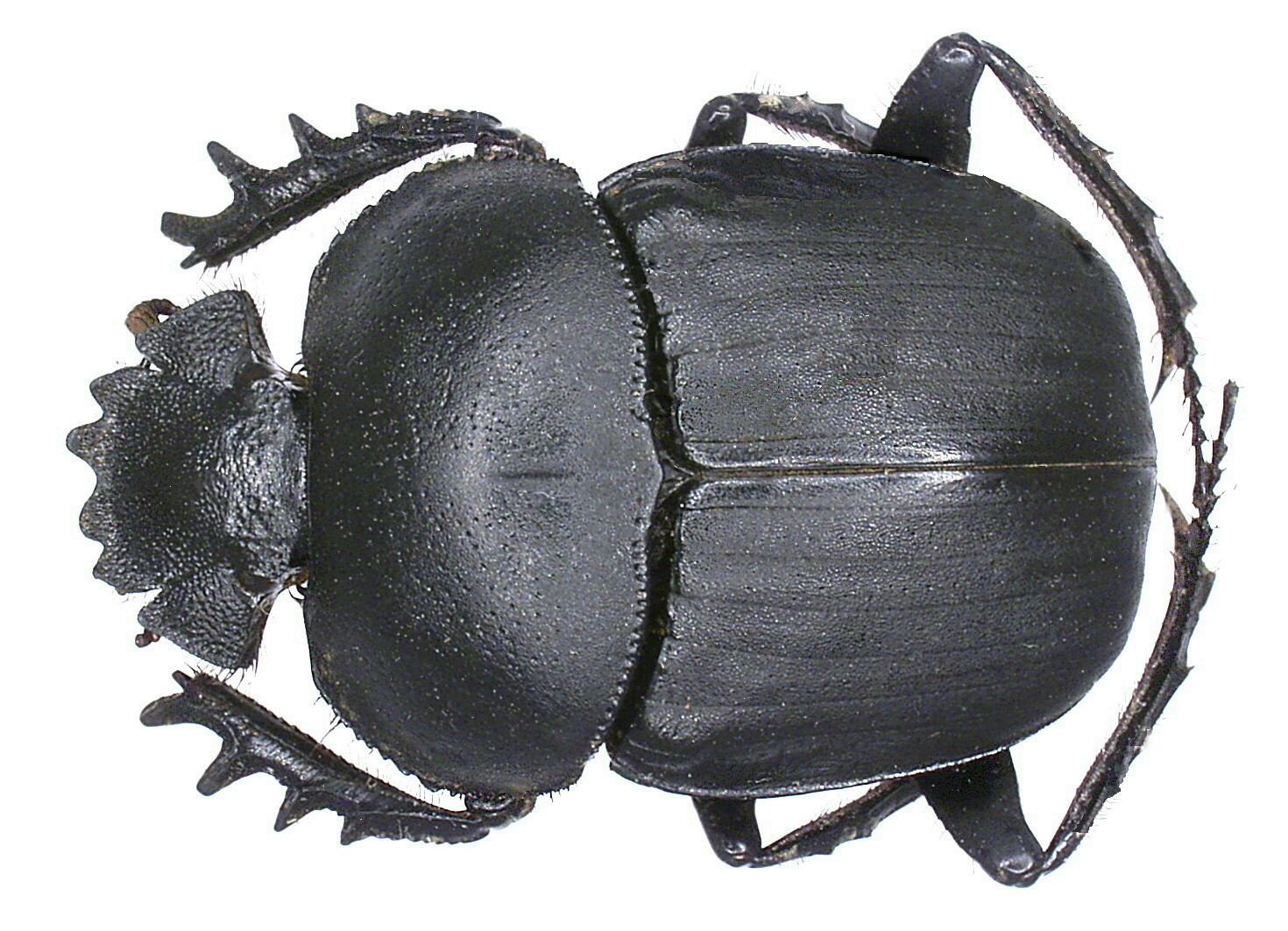

Conservation status
- Least Concern (IUCN 3.1)

Scientific classification
- Kingdom: Animalia
- Phylum: Arthropoda
- Class: Insecta
- Order: Coleoptera
- Suborder: Polyphaga
- Infraorder: Scarabaeiformia
- Family: Scarabaeidae
- Genus: Scarabaeus
- Species: S. ambiguus

Binomial name
- Scarabaeus ambiguus Boheman, 1857

= Scarabaeus ambiguus =

Species of beetle

Scarabaeus ambiguus is a species of Old World dung beetles. This beetle rolls up a ball of dung before laying eggs on it and burying it.

== Description ==
Scarabaeus ambiguus is a large black species of scarab beetle with an adult length of about 24 mm (0.9 in). The forelegs are adapted for squeezing and manipulating loose dung to form balls.

== Distribution and habitat ==
Scarabaeus ambiguus is native to southern Africa, its range including Namibia, Botswana and South Africa. Its range centres on the South African province of KwaZulu-Natal, and adjacent parts of the Eastern Cape where it is found on highveld grassland, bushveld and open woodland, but avoids thick forests and dense stands of trees. It is generally found between elevations of between 1,200 and 1,550 m (3,900 and 5,100 ft).

== Ecology ==
Dung beetles locate dung by detecting the odours produced by its volatile constituents. Different species of dung beetle are attracted to the dung produced by different animals. Scarabaeus ambiguus seems to be attracted by both cattle dung and donkey dung. It is diurnal and is particularly active in the morning, in the cool conditions after heavy rain, when it is on the wing earlier than other species of dung beetle.

== Status ==
Scarabaeus ambiguus seems quite common in suitable habitat within its range.
