= Insect ecology =

Study of how insects interact with their environments

A giant water bug attacking a fish

Insect ecology is the interaction of insects, individually or as a community, with the surrounding environment or ecosystem. This interaction is mostly mediated by the secretion and detection of chemicals (semiochemical) in the environment by insects. Semiochemicals are secreted by the organisms (including insects) in the environment and they are detected by other organism such as insects. Semiochemicals used by organisms, including (insects) to interact with other organism either of the same species or different species can generally grouped into four. These are pheromone, synomones, allomone and kairomone. Pheromones are semiochemicals that facilitates interaction between organisms of same species. Synomones benefit both the producer and receiver, allomone is advantageous to only the producer whiles kairomones is beneficial to the receiver. Insect interact with other species within their community and these interaction include mutualism, commensalism, ammensalism, parasitism and neutralisms.

Insects play significant roles in the ecology of the world due to their vast diversity of form, function, and lifestyle. They are the major contributor to biodiversity in most habitats, except in the sea, they play a variety of important ecological roles in the many functions of an ecosystem. In the case of nutrient recycling, insects contribute to this vital function by degrading or consuming leaf litter, wood, carrion and dung, and by dispersal of fungi. Insects form an important part of the food chain, especially for entomophagous vertebrates such as many mammals, birds, amphibians, and reptiles. Insects play a critical role in maintaining community structure and composition; in the case of animals through diseases transmission, predation and parasitism, and in plants through phytophagy and plant propagation through pollination and seed dispersal. From an anthropocentric point of view, insects compete with humans; they consume as much as 10% of the food produced by man and infect one in six humans with a pathogen.

== Community ecology ==
Community ecology is the process by which a group of organisms which live in the same location interact. There are indirect interactions, such as reproduction, foraging patterns, and decaying. There are also direct interactions, which take the form of symbiosis, competition, and predation, which are the most easily notable. Every organism at its most basic state could be a consumer in some situations, and a producer in others. The culmination of all these interactions is what defines a community and what differentiates one from another. Insects often play numerous roles in these communities, although these roles vary widely based on what species is present. Insects recognize their host (source of food) by means of their visual, olfactory, gustatory, and tactile cues.

=== Decomposers ===
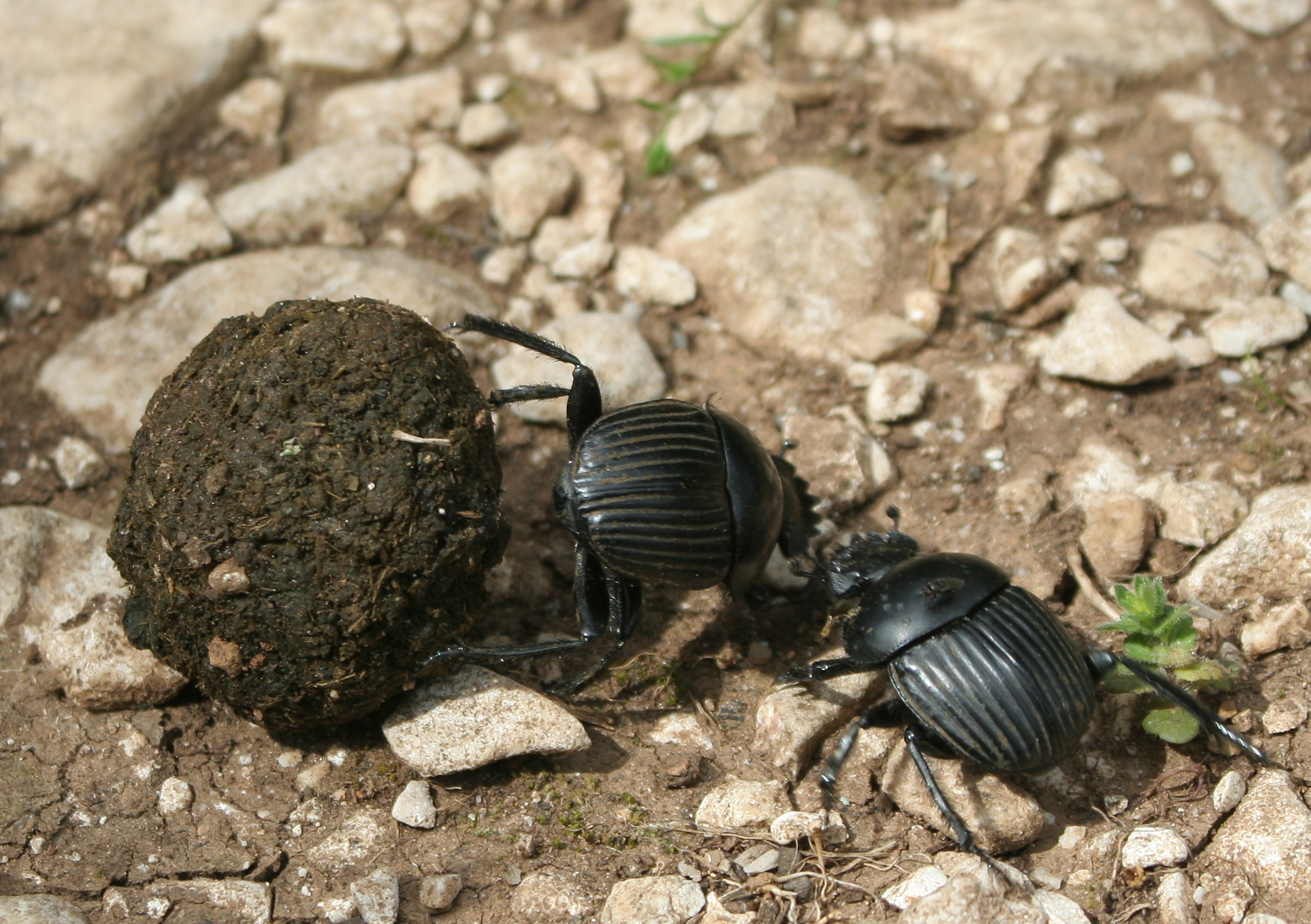
Dung beetles (Scarabaeus laticollis) and dung ball

Decomposer insects are those that feed on dead or rotten bodies of plants or animals. These insects are called saprophages and fall into three main categories: those that feed on dead or dying plant matter, those that feed on dead animals (carrion), and those that feed on excrement (feces) of other animals. As dead plants are eaten away, more surface area is exposed, allowing the plants to decay faster due to an increase in microorganisms that eat the plant. These insects are largely responsible for helping to create a layer of humus on the soil that provides an ideal environment for various fungi and microorganisms. These organisms produce much of the nitrogen, carbon, and minerals that plants require for their growth. Carrion feeders include several beetles, ants, mites, wasps, fly larvae (maggots), and others. These insects occupy the dead body for a short time but rapidly consume and/or bury the carcass. Typically, some species of fly are the first to feed on the dead body, but the order of insects that follow is predictable and is known as the faunal succession. Many dung beetles and dung flies are attracted to the smell of animal feces. The adults often lay egg on fresh excrement and the larvae will feed on the organic matter. Many species of dung-feeders have evolved and only feed on feces from a specific species. There is even a species of dung-beetle that will roll feces into a ball, push it into a pre-dug hole, lays egg in the dung, and then covers it with fresh dirt to provide a perfect nursery for its larvae.

=== Carnivores ===
Carnivorous insects survive by eating other living animals, be it through hunting, blood sucking, or as an internal parasite. These insects fall into three basic categories: predators, parasites, and parasitoids.

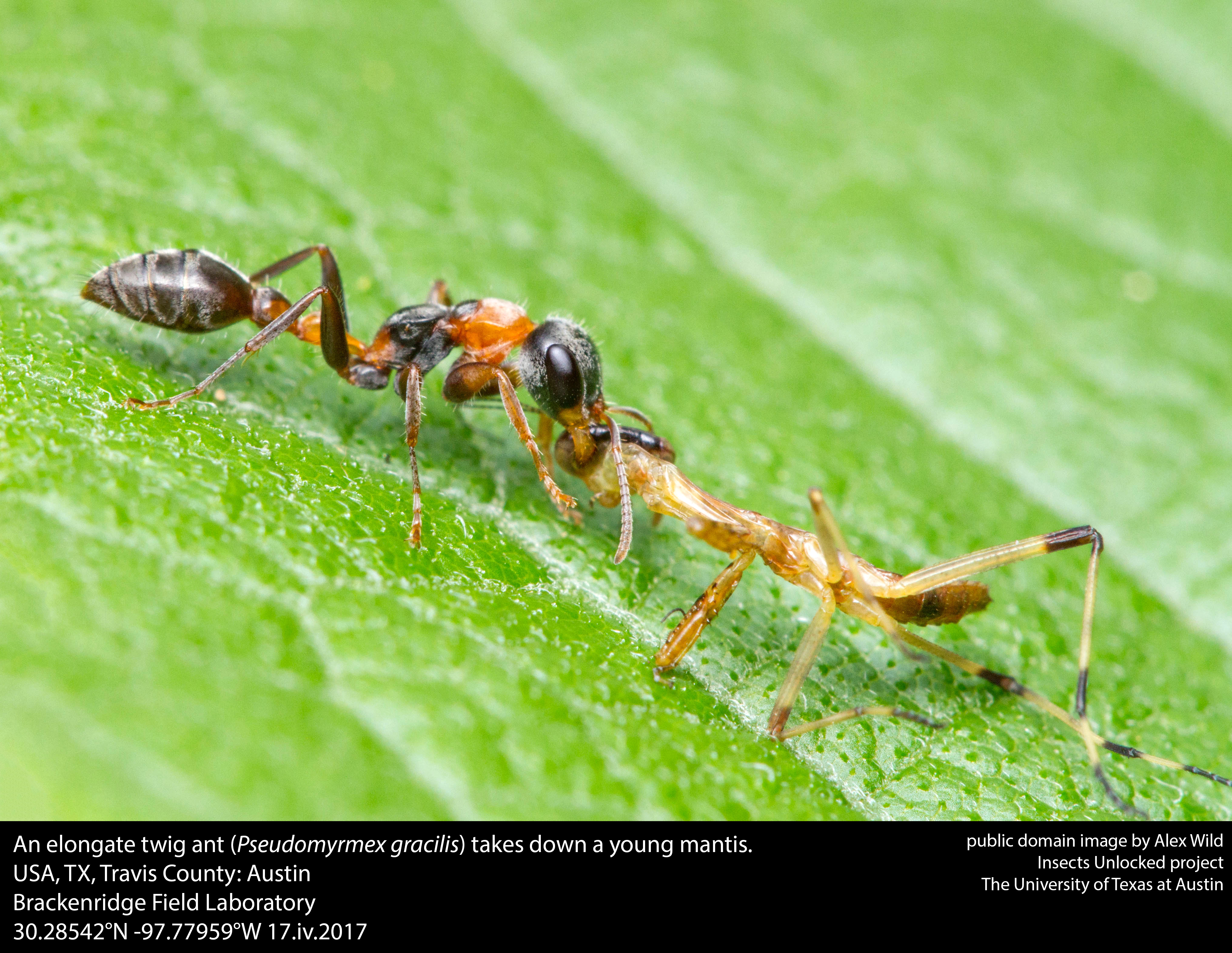
An elongate twig ant (Pseudomyrmex gracilis) attacking a young mantis

Predatory insects are typically larger as their survival is dependent upon their ability to hunt, kill or immobilize, and eat their prey. However, there are several exceptions, with ants being the most notable. Ants, and other colony insects, can use their sheer numbers to overwhelm their prey even if the ants are significantly smaller. They often have specialized mandibles (mouthparts) for this task, some causing excruciating pain, paralysis, or simply having a high bite force. Conversely, insects that live on their own must be able to reliably bring down their prey and as such have developed a myriad of unique hunting methods. Some actively travel, in search of prey, while others wait in ambush. Others may release chemicals to attract certain creatures, and others will eat anything they can.

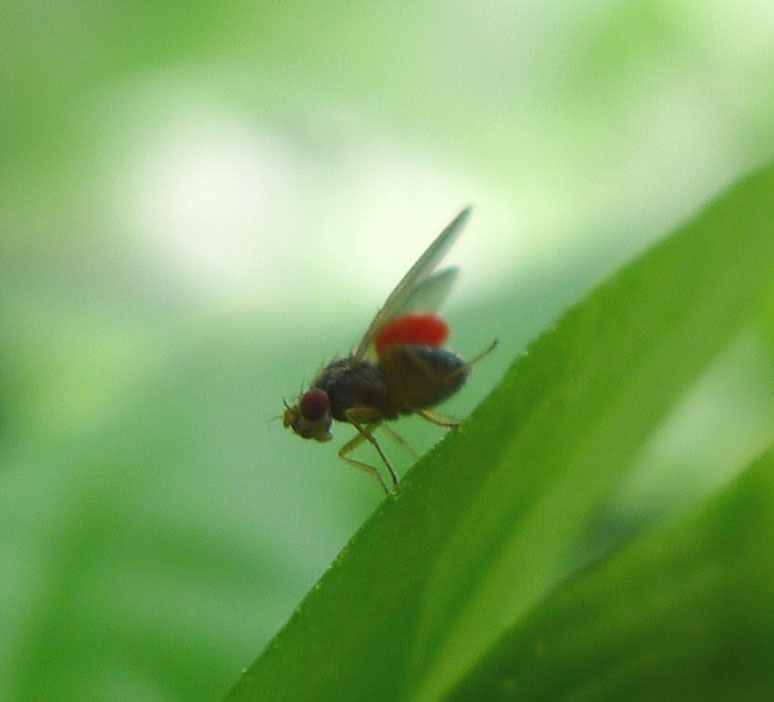
A fly carrying a parasite

Parasitic insects live on or within their hosts. The parasite causes the host some harm, but not enough to kill it. The presence of the parasite is often not noticed by the host, as the size discrepancy is typically so vast. Parasites vary widely in how they survive in or around their hosts; some complete their full life cycle within the body, such as the females of most Strepsiptera species, while others may only stay in for the duration of their larval stage. Kleptopasrasites obtain food by stealing it from their hosts. A kleptoparasite may opportunistically feed on prey that has been recently killed by a predator, such as many adult freeloader flies, or it may deceptively live in the host's nest, such as the majority of the ant crickets. There is as great of variation in methodology and species in parasites as in any other type of insect. The most threatening parasites to humans are ones that live outside the host and consume the host's blood. These species transmit viruses, disease, and even other, smaller parasites to the host, spreading these throughout the populations of many third world countries with poor health care.

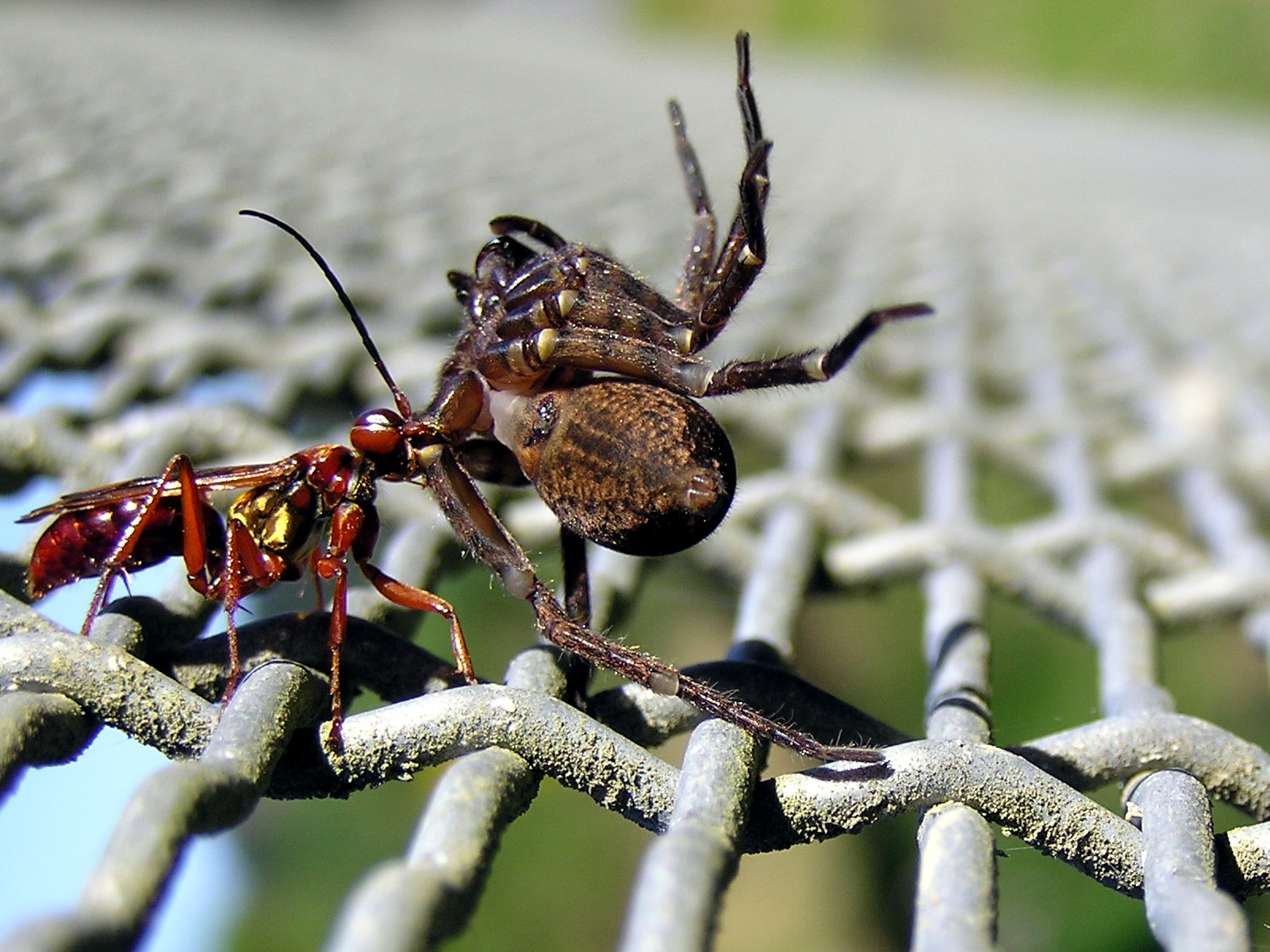
Female golden hunting wasp dragging paralysed spider into its nest

A subcategory of parasites known as parasitoids. A parasitoid is an organism which develop on or in another organism (host), derives its nourishment from the host and eventually kills the host. In insects, a parasitoid is an insects whose larvae grows by feeding in or on another arthropod (host) and eventually killing the host. The majority of parasitoids insects consume their victims as larvae, while the adults often feed on nectar or other organic material. One family of wasps, the spider wasps, will paralyze spiders before bringing them back to their nest and laying an egg on the spider's abdomen. Other parasitoid wasps, such as ichneumon and braconid wasps, lay their eggs on or directly inside of their hosts. Many of the adult female wasps have long ovipositors, which may be longer than the entire body length of the adult. Parasitoid beetles in the family Ripiphoridae attack various types of insects, as do most members of the large family of tachinid flies.

=== Herbivores ===
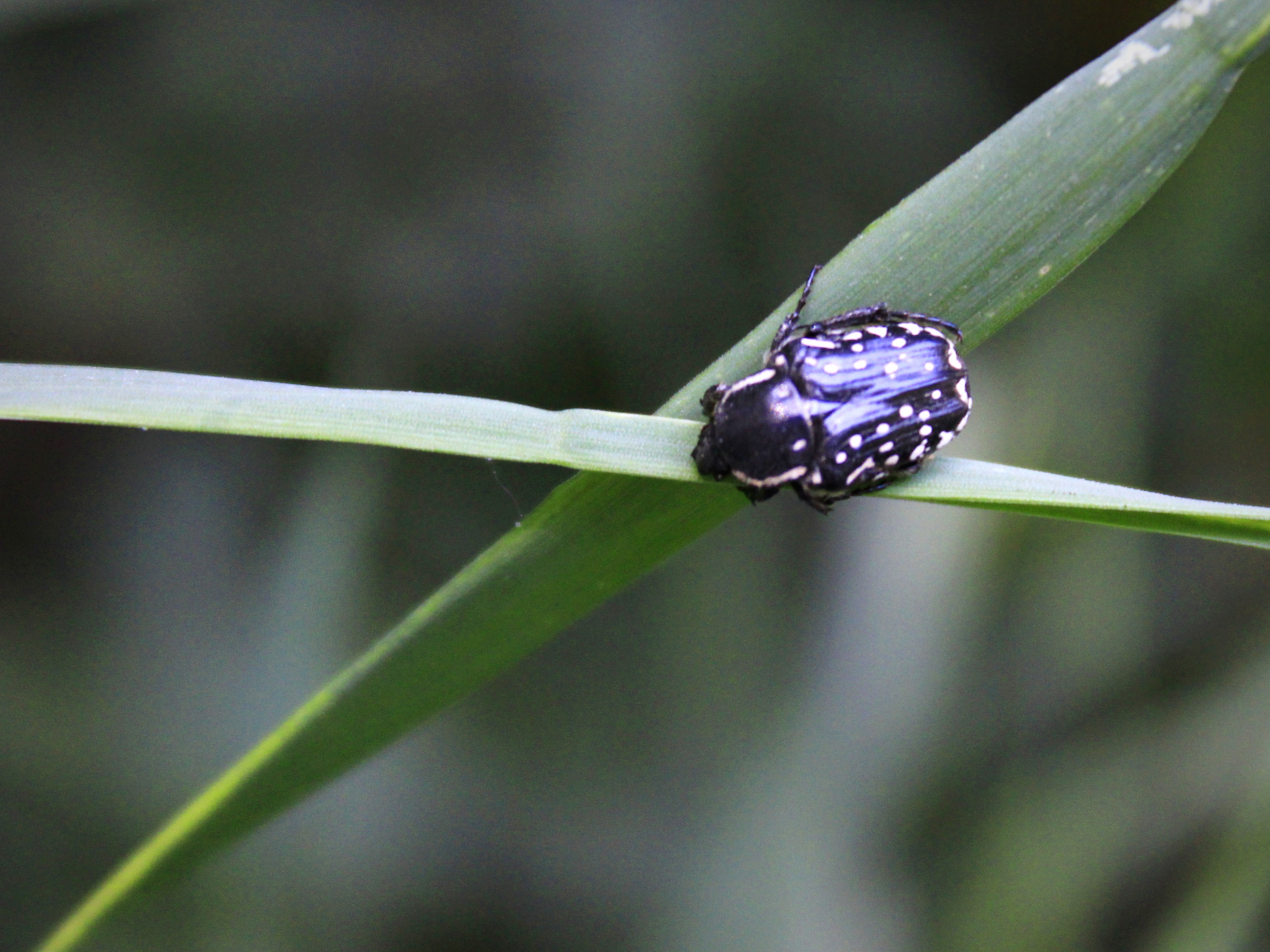
A phytotophagous/herbivorous insect

Out of all described eukaryotes almost one third are herbivorous insects, about 500,000. They feed on living plant matter or the products of a plant. They are also called phytophagous insects. These insects may eat essential parts of the plant, such as the leaves or sap, or they may survive on the pollen and nectar produced by the plant. These insects will compete with other organisms for limited plant host in an environment where there is constant change in plant availability and quality. Herbivorous insects often use olfactory or visual cues to determine a potential host plant. A visual cue could simply be the outline of a certain type of leaf, or the high contrast between the petals of a flower and the leaves surrounding it. These are typically associated with the olfactory signal an insect may receive from their intended meal. The olfactory cue could be the scent of the nectar produced by a flower, a certain chemical excreted to repel unwanted predators, or the exposed sap of a cherry tree. Either of these two senses could be the driving force behind an insect choosing to consume a certain plant, but it is only after it takes the first bite, and the confirmation of this food is made by its sense of taste, that it truly feeds. Since most insects depend on plants as their source of food, plants have developed some defensive mechanisms to protect themselves from insects. These mechanisms are largely grouped in two; antibiosis and antixenosis resistance. With antibiosis, the defensive trait of the plants affects the growth, survival and development of the insect but with the antixenosis defense, chemical and morphological factors affect the feeding behavior of plant. Plants have evolved to produce several secondary metabolic substance to protect themselves from herbivores insects. These chemicals are grouped into alkaloids, terpenoids and phenolics. Insects also have developed mechanism to detoxify these chemicals produced by their host plants. After a herbivorous insect is finished feeding on a plant, it will either wait there until hungry again, or move on to another task, be it finding more food, a mate, or shelter. Herbivorous insects bring significantly more danger to a plant than that of consumption; they are among the most prominent disease-carrying creatures in the insect world. There are numerous diseases, fungi, and parasites that can be carried by nearly any herbivorous insect, many of which fatal to the plant infected. Some diseases even produce a sweet smelling, sticky secretion from the infected plant to attract more insects and spread farther. In return plants have their own defenses. Some of these defenses are toxic secondary metabolites to deter insects. These toxins limit the diet breadth of herbivores, and evolving mechanisms to nonetheless continue herbivory is an important part of maintaining diet breadth in insects, and so in their evolutionary history as a whole. Both pleiotropy and epistasis have complex effects in this regard, with the simulations of Griswold 2006 showing that more genes provide the benefit of more targets for adaptive mutations, while Fisher 1930 showed that a mutation can improve one trait while epistasis causes it to also trigger negative effects - slowing down adaptation.

Schoonhoven and associates, from Blaney et al. 1985 to Schoonhoven et al. 1992, illuminate the interplay between chemoreceptor stimuli in Lepidoptera and Orthoptera. They used Helicoverpa armigera, Spodoptera littoralis, S. frugiperda, Chloridea virescens, and grasshoppers. They find that most insects respond immediately and roughly equally to phagostimulant – indicating good food – and phagodeterrent – indicating a food to be avoided, or a material which is not food – substances. They also present some divergent examples, both delayed response – suggesting that food decisions were mediated by cognition and not just simple chemoreception – and unequal chemoreceptor stimulation – with gustatory cells firing equally when presented with any material, but deterrent cells firing to a greater degree for undesirable materials. (They also investigate similar questions of seeking/avoidance in common questions of dietary balance of protein and carbohydrate – i.e. less risky dietary choices where toxins are not the deciding factor – and find similar results, with some insects eating solely by chemoreception and some showing delayed decisions, suggesting cognition.) Both salicin and caffeine are antifeedants, and some of the Schoonhoven group's investigations test both the deterrence they produce and habituation to them. The Glendinning group has done some similar work. They find Manduca sexta's habituation to salicin to be cognitively mediated because deterrent sensory cell stimulation barely decreases even when avoidance ceases. On the other hand, Glendinning et al. 1999 finds M. sexta habituation to caffeine to be due to change in chemoreceptor activation because it decreases significantly, and at the same time as cessation of feeding avoidance. The same work tests the cross-effects of habituation between the two chemicals, finding that they probably share a second messenger. For both phagostimulus and deterrence stimuli they find that the effects of multiple stimulations by multiple substances – upon the same cells, simultaneously – produce additive effects, up to the cell's firing rate ceiling.

Climate change is expected to change herbivory relationships. Liu et al. 2011 finds no change in distribution in one example, but instead the same herbivore switched primary hosts due to altered flowering time. Gillespie et al. 2012 found host mismatch due to temperature shift. (These methodologies in herbivory could be applied to study the same question in climate change + pollination. As of 2014 however this remains to be tried.)

== Interspecific relationships ==
Due to their diverse functions, diets, and lifestyles, insects are integral components of terrestrial ecological communities. Beyond functioning as decomposers, carnivores, and herbivores, insects often participate in other species interactions such as symbiosis. These interactions can both positively and adversely affect plants, mammals, and other insects. These relationships are mostly symbiotic relations. An insect host, or macrosymbiont, may engage in interactions that either provide mutual benefits (mutualism) or have no impact (commensalism) on its associated microsymbionts, such as protozoa, algae, fungi, bacteria, or viruses.

=== Symbiosis ===
Symbiosis is a broad term that encompasses various types of long-term interactions between different species. Symbiotic relationship exist between insects and other organisms. It has been demonstrated that the symbiotic relationship between insect and microorganisms is a common phenomena. Some symbionts are parasitic with negative effects on the hosts, some are commensalistic with no apparent effects on the hosts, and others are mutualistic with beneficial effects on the hosts. Recent behavioral studies on symbiont-infected and uninfected insects have shown that not only parasitic or pathogenic microbes but also commensalistic and mutualistic microbes can influence the host's behavior in ways that seem adaptive and these symbiotic interactions can often shift from one form to another due to external factors or internal changes driven by the symbionts themselves. A typical characteristic of insect-microorganism symbioses is the reliance on nutritionally imbalanced substrates. Some microsymbionts may also aid their insect hosts in overcoming the defenses of their plant or animal hosts. Resident microorganisms can protect their insect hosts from natural enemies through various mechanisms. In addition to enhancing the host's immune responses against such threats, symbionts can outcompete pathogens and parasites for microsites within the host and produce harmful secondary compounds that work alongside the insect's immune defenses. For example, Pseudomonas sp. in Paederus rove beetles synthesizes the polyketide "pederin", which protects the beetles from predation. A specific example of such interactions is bacteriocyte-associated symbionts, which are passed directly from mothers to their offspring during the early stages of egg or embryo development. This transmission, integrated into the insect's developmental process, ensures the continuation of the symbiosis. While mutualism and parasitism are specific types of symbiotic relationships, there are other forms as well. For instance, in some cases, insects may engage in symbiotic relationships where one species benefits while the other is unaffected, this is known as commensal symbiosis. In other cases, obligate symbiosis is a specific class of insect symbiosis that plays a crucial role in overcoming nutrient limitations. In this type of symbiotic relationship, many insects rely on microbial partners for nutrients supplementation.

The insect-symbiont interactions generate morphological adaptations and mechanism that insects use to protect, nourish, and transport their microbial partners. Examples include fermentation chambers, bucal pockets, blind sacs, crypt guts, diverticula, crypt cells, bacteriocytes, mycetocytes, and mycetomes, as well as instances where bacterial endosymbionts are distributed throughout the lymph. Additionally, numerous morphological adaptations support fungal ectosymbionts. Structures such as mycangia have been identified in locations like the prothorax, pronotum, coxa, mesonotum, mandibles, pharynx, and elytra.

Pollination of a flowering plant by a bee.

=== Mutualism ===
Mutualism is a symbiotic relationship between two species in which each benefits. In this type of relationships, each species involved provides some services to the other species and this could be nutrition, defense etc. Signaling is known to play a major role in selecting mutualistic partners. Odors and chemical detection is involved in the formation of symbiotic relation between most fungus-growing insect. The attraction of ambrosia beetle to its fungal symbionts indicate that some signaling by microbial volatile organic compound s(MVOCs) produced by the fungi leads to this partner choice. In Ambrosia symbiosis, the ambrosia beetle obtains nutrition from the ambrosia fungi while the fungi relies on its host ( ambrosia beetle) for its dispersal and cultivar maintenance. Another common mutualistic relationships include cleaning symbiosis, animal induced pollination, or protection from predators. One example of insect mutualism is the pollination of flowering plants by insects, a field of study known as anthecology. Primarily, various bee species work as pollinators of flowering plants, feeding on their nectar and in turn picking up their pollen and spreading it to other flowers. Another example of insect mutualism is the relationship between ants and aphids. The aphids provide food (honeydrew) for the ants and the ants in return protect the aphid from its predators by feeding on the predators. Another notable example is the relationship between aphids (Hemiptera: Aphididae) and their symbiotic bacterium Buchnera aphidicola. These microbes are situated within specialized internal structures known as bacteriomes, within the insect's body. Since aphids' diet of plant sap lacks certain essential amino acids and vitamins, Buchnera supplies these nutrients to them. In exchange, aphids provide Buchnera with a protected environment within specialized cells, as Buchnera's genome is highly reduced, rendering it incapable of surviving independently.

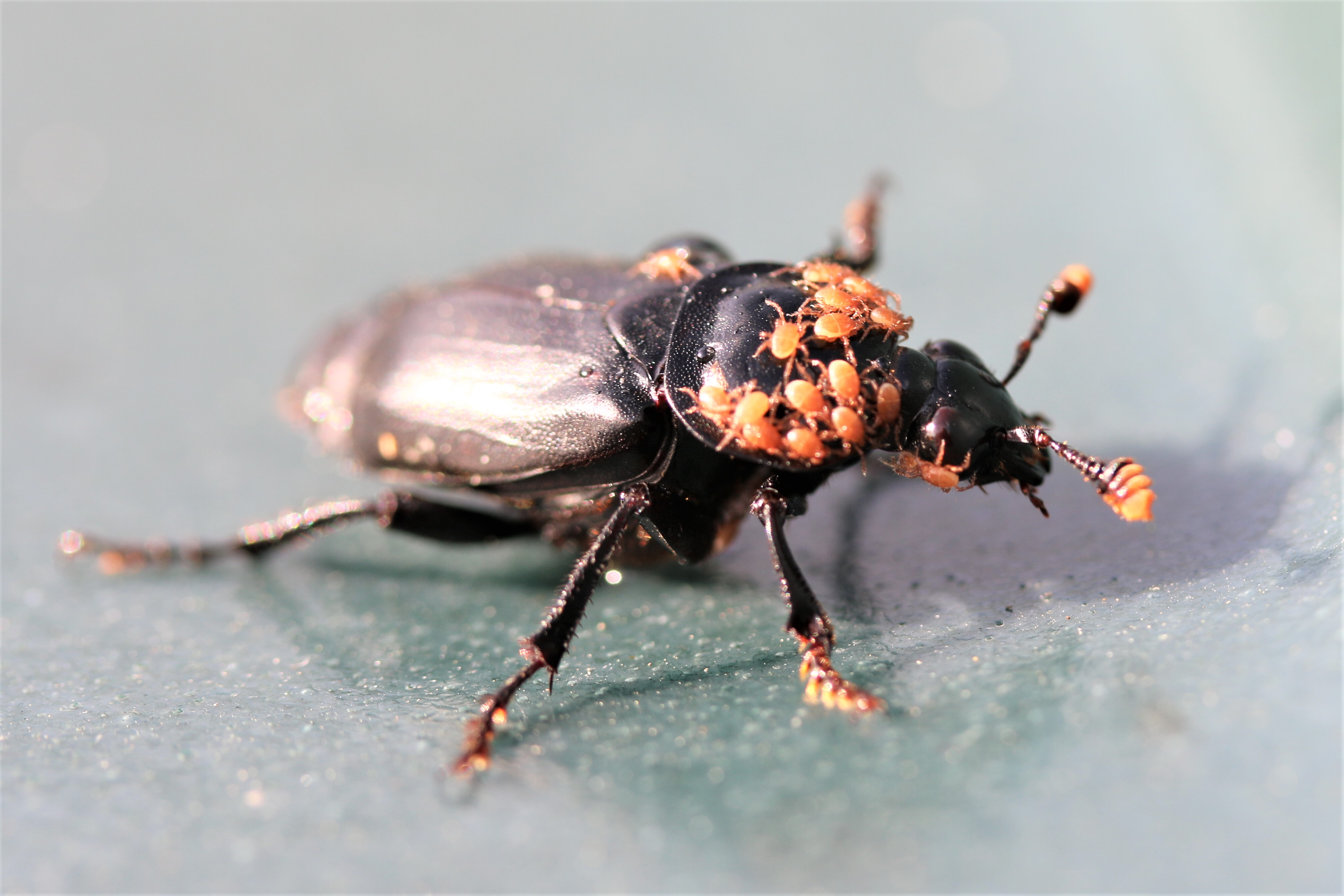
Mites benefiting from the movement of Nicrophorus humator.

=== Commensalism ===
Commensalism is a different type of ecological interaction between species in which one species gains benefits while the other is neither harmed nor benefited. Two examples of commensalism that can be seen in insect ecology are phoresy, an interaction in which one attaches itself to another for transportation, and inquilinism, the use of another organism for shelter. Ticks and mites have adapted to latch onto beetles, flies, and bees (as well as other organisms) for transportation, an example of phoresy. In terms of inquilinism, insects commonly establish themselves in human garages or shelters of other animals for protection against predators and weather.

=== Parasitoid insects ===
Parasitoids are insects that live intimately with a host, feed off of the host like a parasite, but eventually kill the host. This specific type of species interaction is exclusive to insects and is employed most commonly by wasps. An example of this is when parasitoid wasps inject their eggs into aphids. The eggs will eventually hatch and produce wasp larvae that feed on and consume the organism. Additionally, some parasitoids chemically affect the host to propagate the development of parasitic offspring. Parasitoid wasps typically prey on a specific insect or spider species, and the host life-stage at which the wasp deposits its seed differs. In regard to humans, parasitoid insects are favored because they can be used as biological pest controls for farmers, preying on other insects that damage crops.

=== Competition ===
Insects often compete with each other for resources such as food, territory, and mates. Competition can occur within species (intraspecific) or between species (interspecific). This competition can lead to adaptations and niche differentiation, where species evolve to occupy different ecological niches to minimize competition.

=== Neutralism ===
In some cases, insects may interact with each other without affecting one another positively or negatively. They simply coexist without any significant impact on each other's fitness or survival. In such a relationship, the interaction that happens between the organisms involved are always indirect or incidental. This type of relationship is often observed when insects occupy different habitats or have minimal interactions. Another example is when a bird uses a tree as a lookout without having feeding on the plant or insect on the plant. An example of such relationship is the one that exist between a tarantulas and a cacti that live in a barren region.

=== Facilitation ===
Facilitation occurs when one species indirectly benefits another species by modifying the environment. For example, certain insects may create microhabitats or modify resources that become beneficial for other insect species. An example of this could be a species of insect that creates shelter or nesting sites that are subsequently utilized by other insect species.

=== Amensalism ===
Amensalism is a non-symbiotic species interaction in which one organism negatively affects the other organism but is unaffected by that organism. This type of species interaction is common in nature, and an example in insect ecology is between goats and insects. The two individuals compete for the same food source, but goats will deprive the latter from feeding. The goat is completely unaffected by the interaction, but the insect is left hungry.

=== Mimicry ===
Insects may evolve to mimic the appearance, behavior, or other characteristics of other species. This can be beneficial for the mimicking species in various ways, such as gaining protection from predators or gaining access to resources. For example, some harmless insects mimic the appearance of more dangerous or unpalatable species to avoid predation.

=== Allelopathy ===
Allelopathy involves the release of chemicals by one species that affects the growth, development, or behavior of another species. While this type of interaction is more commonly associated with plants, certain insects may also engage in allelopathic relationships with each other. These chemicals can influence competition, reproduction, or survival of other insect species in the vicinity.

== Coevolution ==
Coevolution is the ecological process by which two species exclusively affect each other's evolution. This concept is essential to the study of insect ecology. Coevolution is particularly important in how it can lead to both micro- and macro-evolutionary changes. Micro-evolutionary changes include shifts in genome and alleles while macro-evolution is the emergence of a new species, also called speciation. Two species that coevolve experience reciprocal evolution and go through biological changes as a result of the other species. One example of this in insect ecology is the coevolution of Dasyscolia ciliata, a species of wasp, and Ophrys speculum, a species of orchid. These two species have both evolved in such a way that the wasp is the only known pollinator of the plant. This relationship can be seen in other species of flowering plants and pollinating insects, but a more distinct example is the coevolution of ants and acacias. The acacia ant (Pseudomyrmex ferruginea) is an insect that has been discovered to protect five different species of acacia trees. The ant provides protection to the plant while the acacias reciprocate by supplying food and shelter. Over generations, these two species have adapted to accommodate each other, an example of coevolution.

== Role ==
Insects play numerous roles which have both negative and positive impact on the environment and other organisms. These roles include pollination, seed dispersal, improving soil fertility, act as a source of food for other organisms and involve in disease transmission. Pollination and seed dispersal is known to be mostly caused by animals; and insects are responsible for about 85% of pollination in angiosperms. Ants are known to cause dispersion of the seeds of more than 100 species of plants found in Brazilian Caatinga. Soil dwelling insects such as ant, termites and beetles help in the decomposition of plant residue, aeration of soil and enhancement of soil structure. These activities help in improving soil health and fertility. Insects again serve as a source of food for other organism such as reptiles, bird, amphibians, fishes and many others. Insects are also involved in the transfer of vector borne disease which accounts for approximately 700,000 death annually.
