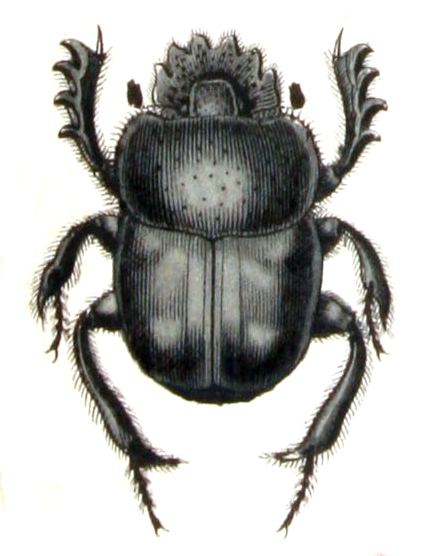
- Scarabaeus pius

Scientific classification
- Kingdom: Animalia
- Phylum: Arthropoda
- Class: Insecta
- Order: Coleoptera
- Suborder: Polyphaga
- Infraorder: Scarabaeiformia
- Family: Scarabaeidae
- Subfamily: Scarabaeinae
- Tribe: Scarabaeini
- Genus: Scarabaeus; Linnaeus, 1758

Synonyms
- Drepanopodus Janssens, 1940; Actinophorus Creutzer, 1799; Madateuchus Paulian, 1953; Mnematidium Ritsema, 1883; Mnematium MacLeay, 1821; Neateuchus Gillet, 1911; Neomnematium Janssens, 1938; Neopachysoma Ferreira, 1953; Sebasteos Westwood, 1847

= Scarabaeus =

Genus of beetles

The genus Scarabaeus consists of a number of Afro-Eurasian dung beetle species, including the "sacred scarab beetle", Scarabaeus sacer and is the namesake of the tribe Scarabaeini, the family Scarabaeidae, the superfamily Scarabaeoidea and the infraorder Scarabaeiformia. These beetles feed exclusively on dung, which they accomplish by rolling a piece of dung some distance from where it was deposited, and burying it in order to feed on it underground. They also prepare food for their larvae by excavating an underground chamber, and filling it with balls that have eggs laid in them. The growing larva feeds upon the dung ball, pupates, and eventually emerges as an adult.

A "scarabaeus" is also a now outdated term (OED 2) for an object in the form of a scarab beetle in art. The scarab was a popular form of amulet in Ancient Egypt, and in ancient Greek art engraved gems were often carved as scarabs on the rest of the stone behind the main flattish face, which was used for sealing documents.

A creature identified as Scarabaeus appears in "The Gold-Bug" by Edgar Allan Poe, and a poem entitled "Scarabæus sisyphus" was created by Mathilde Blind.

== Gallery ==
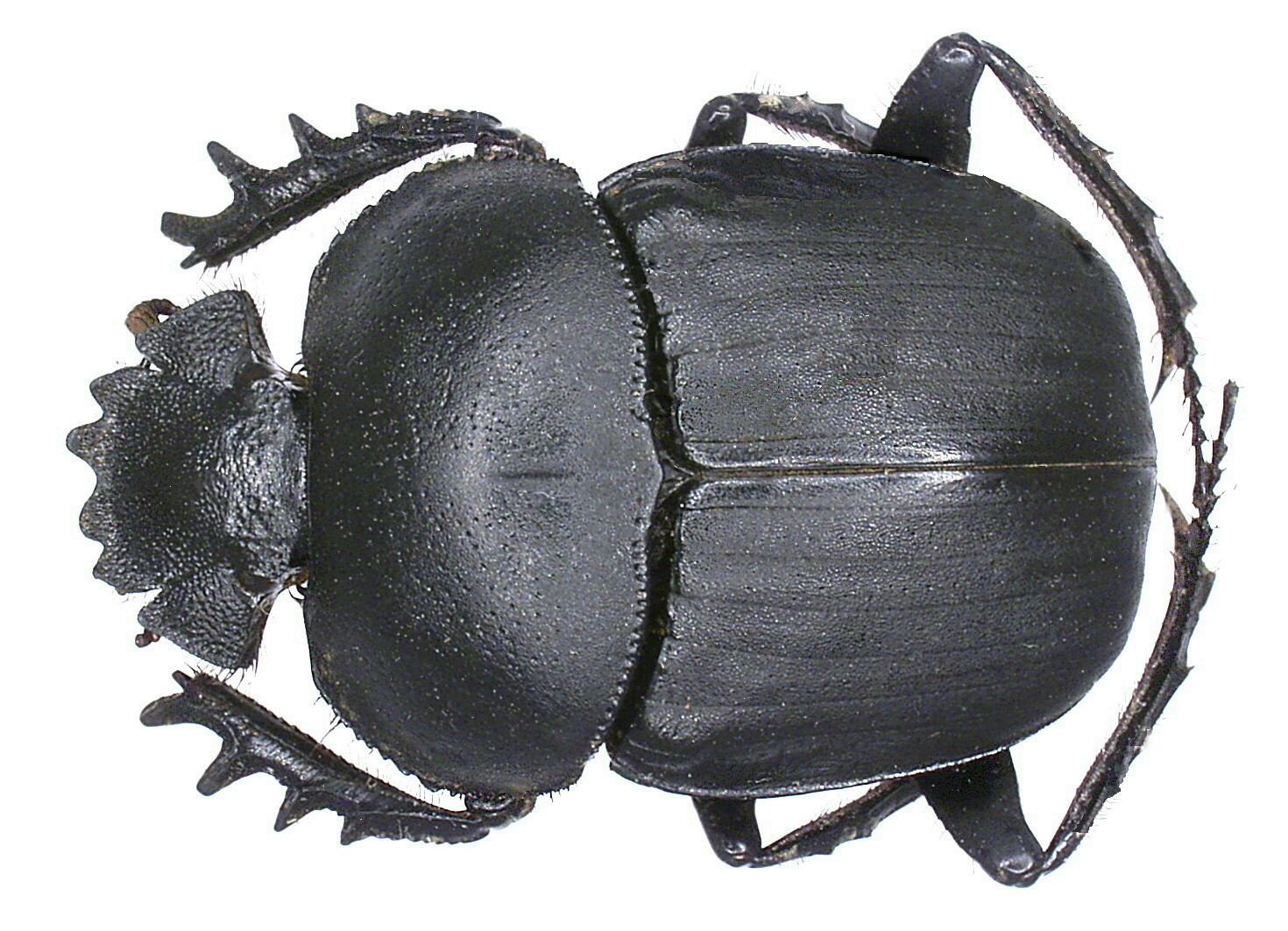
Scarabaeus ambiguus

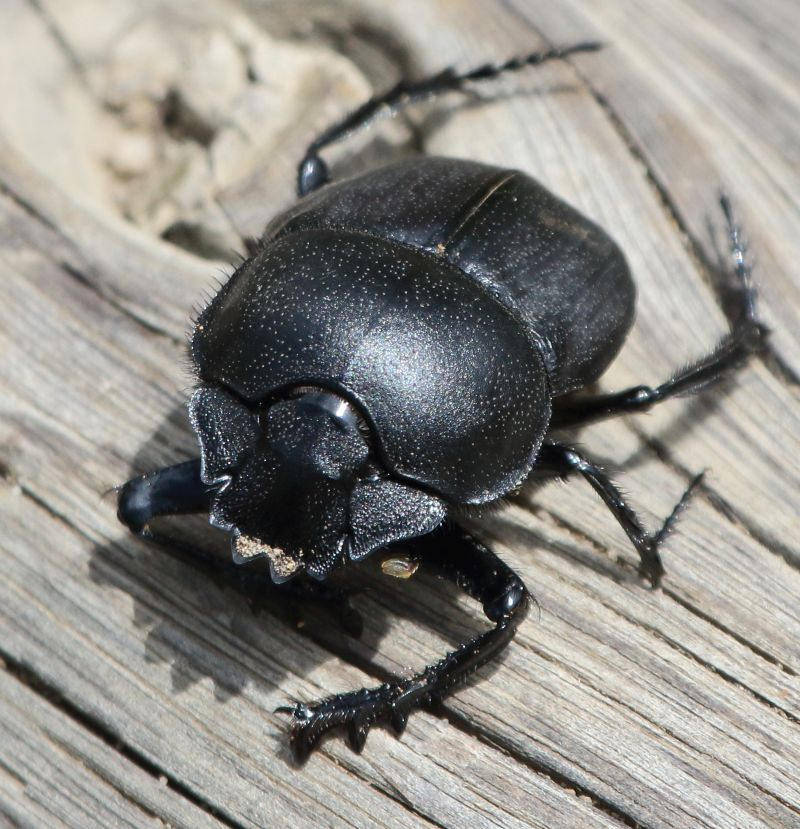
Scarabaeus caffer

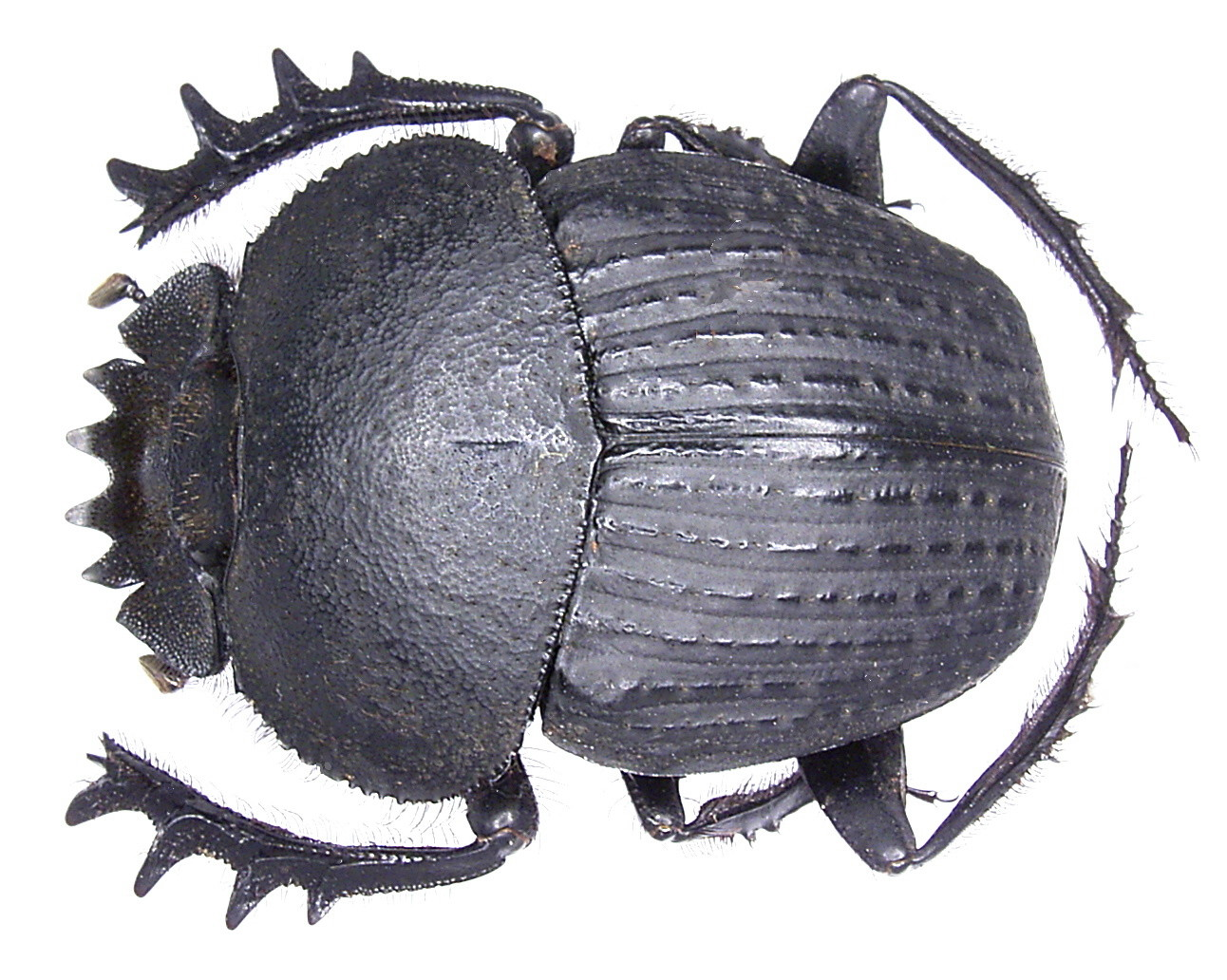
Scarabaeus catenatus

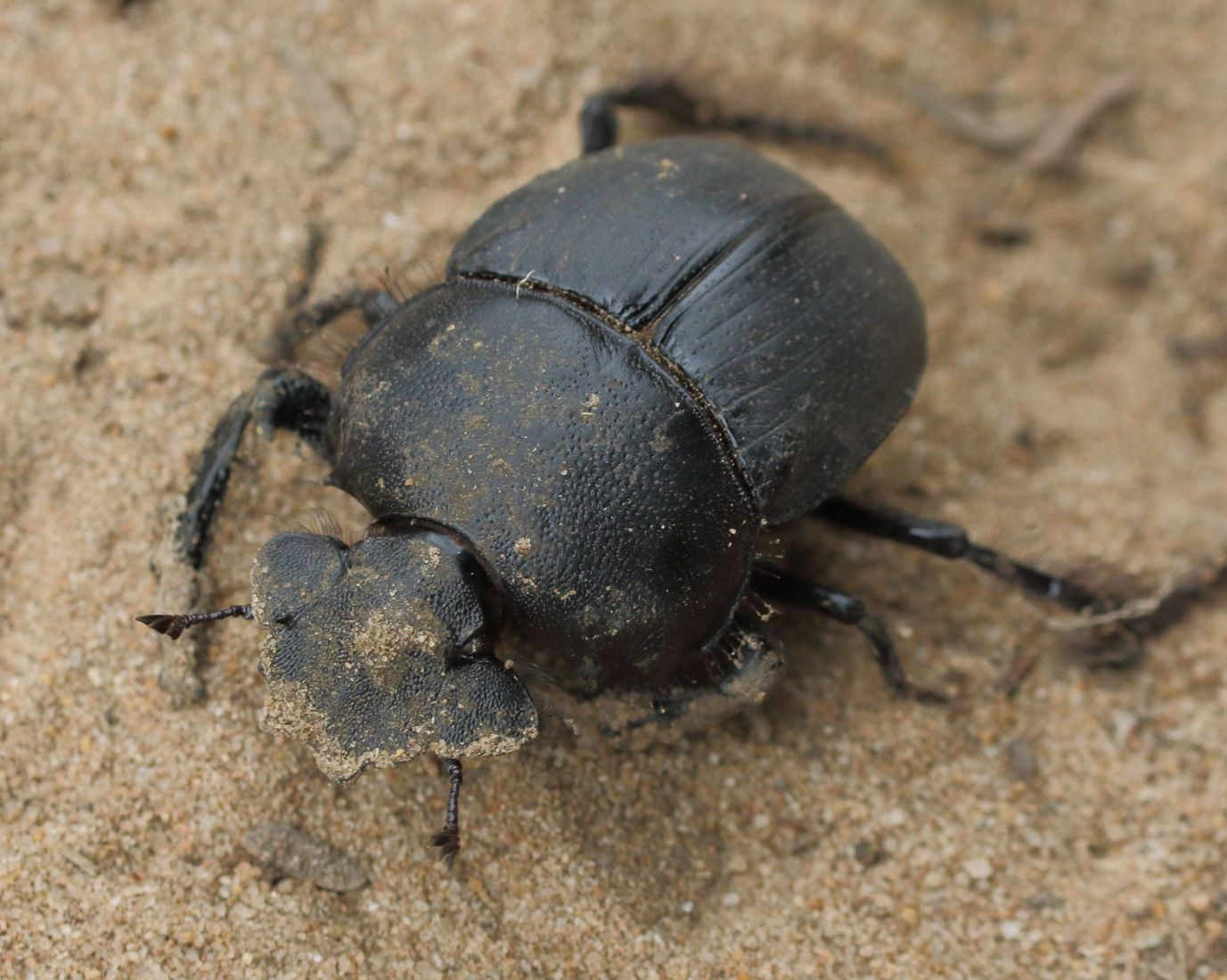
Scarabaeus geminogalenus

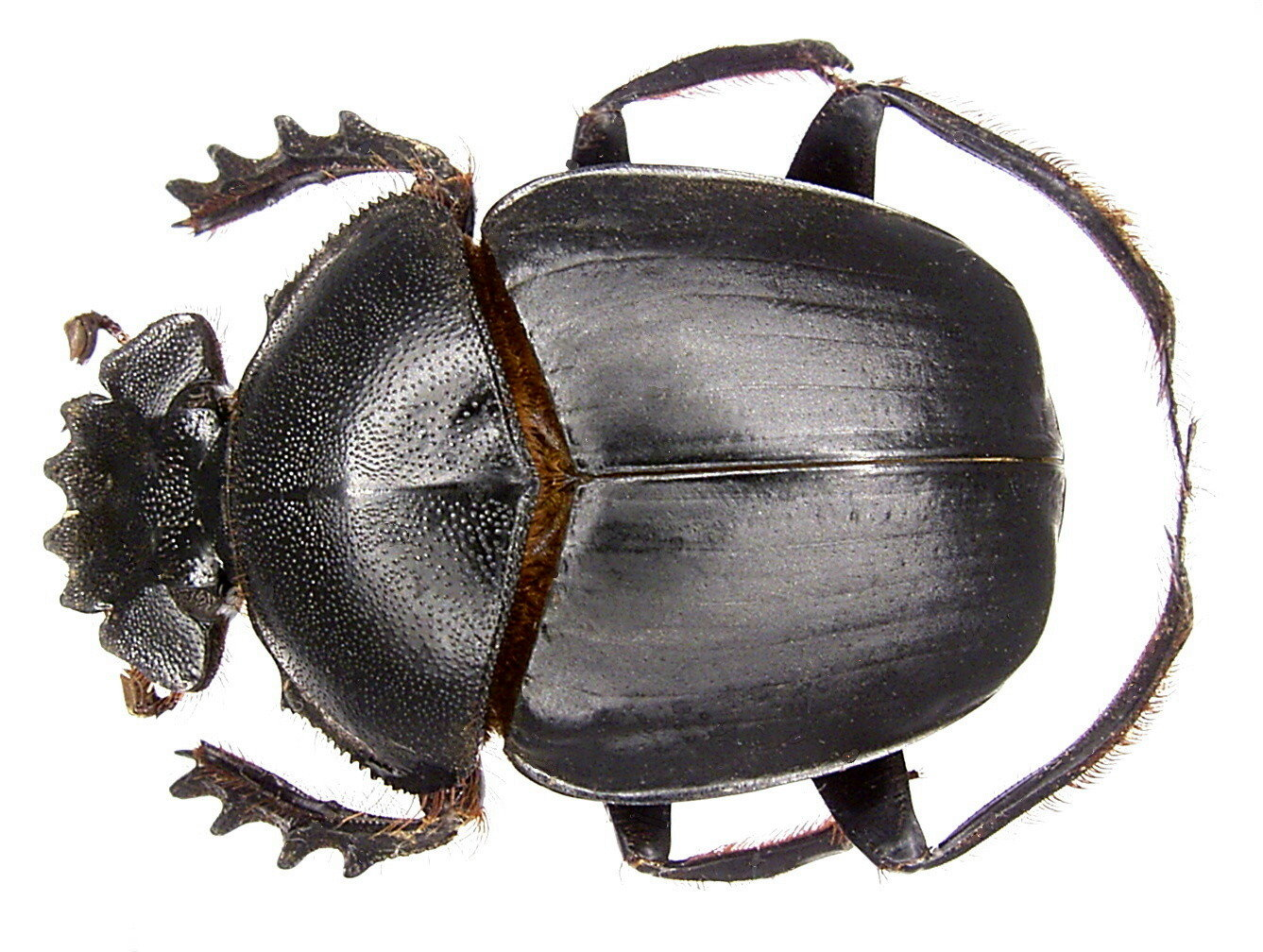
Scarabaeus jalof

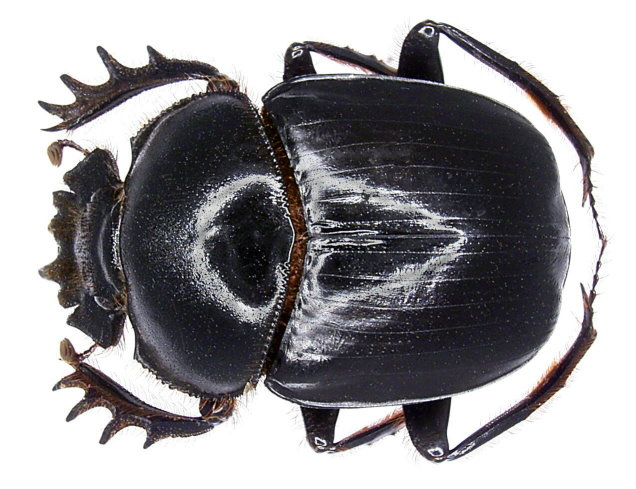
Scarabaeus nitidicollis

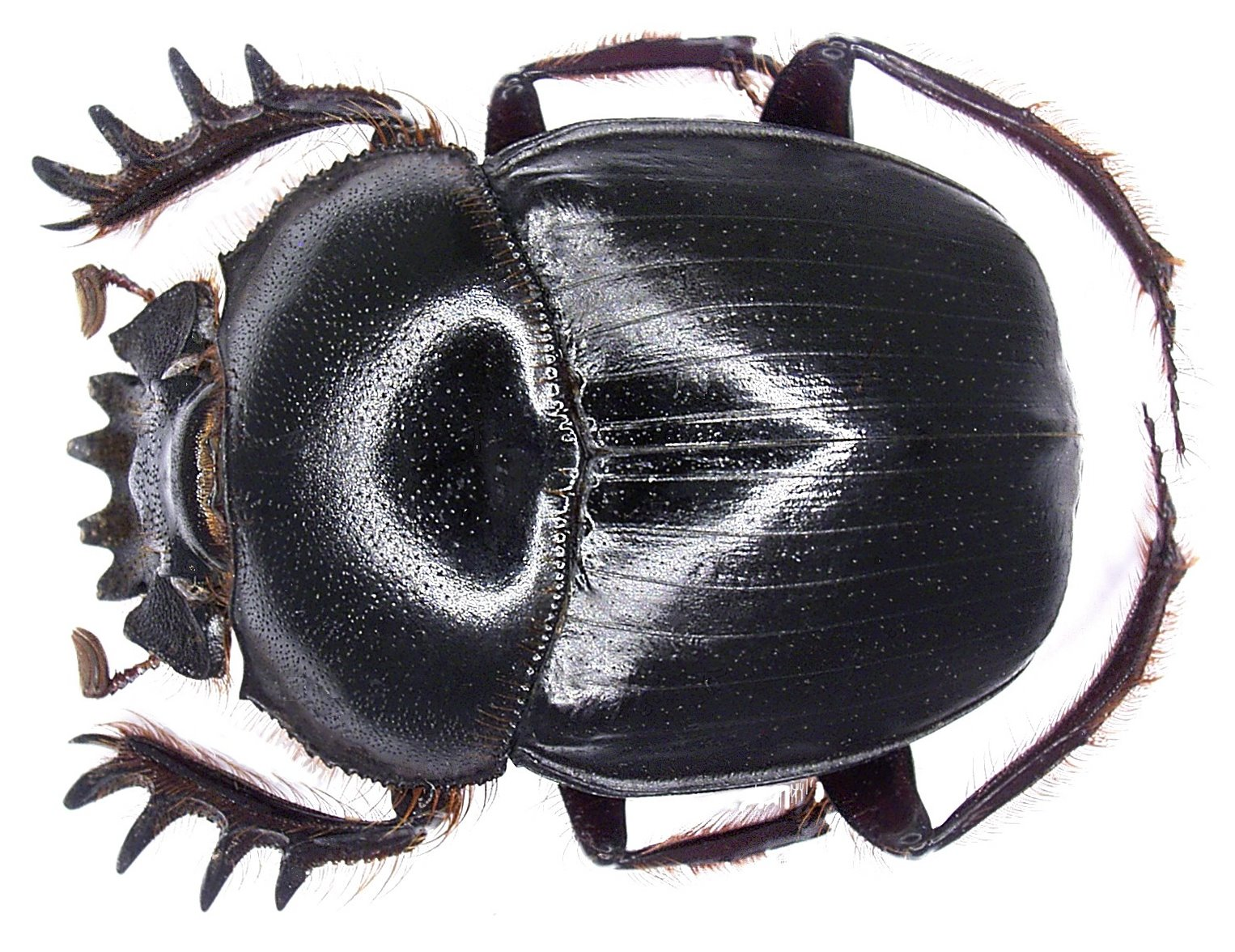
Scarabaeus satyrus

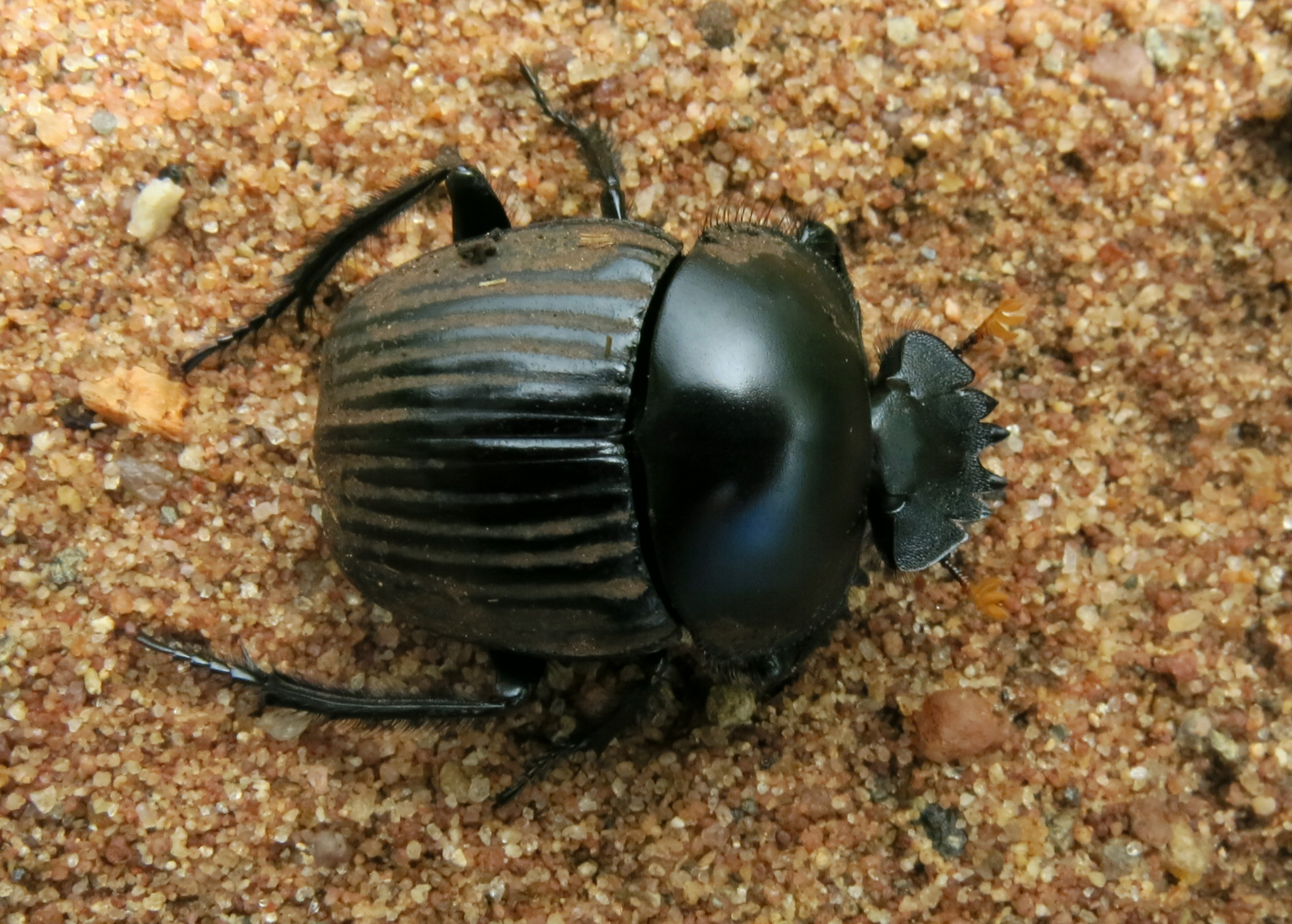
Scarabaeus schulzeae

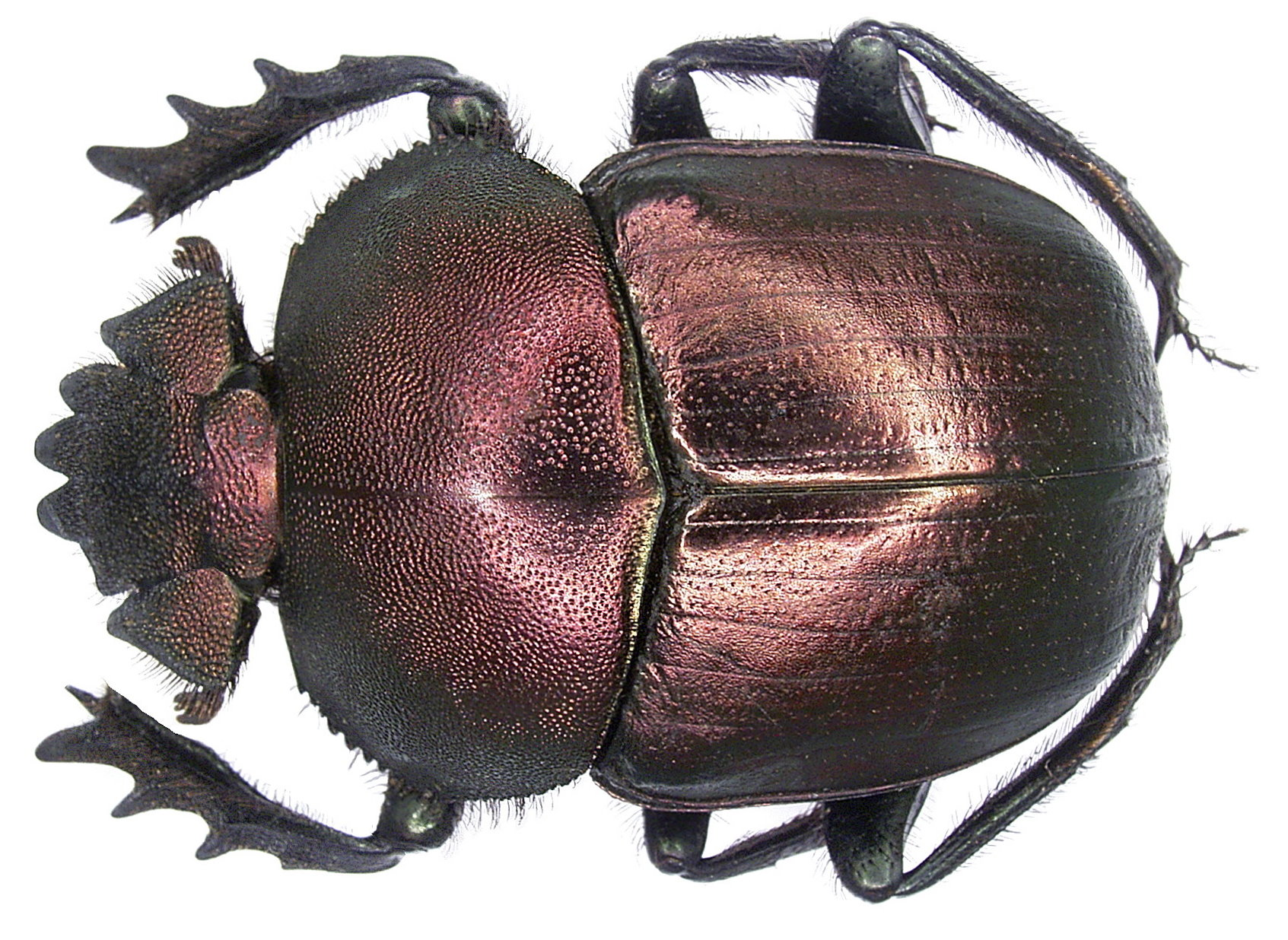
Scarabaeus (Kheper) nigroaeneus

== Subgenera and species ==
The following subgenera are accepted in BioLib:

1. Ateuchetus Bedel, 1892
2. Escarabaeus Zídek & Pokorny, 2011
3. Kheper Janssens, 1940
4. Mnematidium Ritsema, 1888
5. Pachylosoma Zídek & Pokorný, 2008
6. Pachysoma MacLeay, 1821
7. Scarabaeolus Balthasar, 1965
8. Scarabaeus Linnaeus, 1758
9. incertae sedis

All species

- Scarabaeus acuticollis
- Scarabaeus aegyptiacus
- Scarabaeus aegyptiorum
- Scarabaeus aeratus
- Scarabaeus aesculapius
- Scarabaeus alienus
- Scarabaeus ambiguus
- Scarabaeus anderseni
- Scarabaeus andreaei
- Scarabaeus andrewesi
- Scarabaeus armeniacus
- Scarabaeus asceticus
- Scarabaeus babori
- Scarabaeus bannuensis
- Scarabaeus basuto
- Scarabaeus bennigseni
- Scarabaeus bohemani
- Scarabaeus bonellii
- Scarabaeus bornemizzai
- Scarabaeus brahminus
- Scarabaeus caffer
- Scarabaeus canaliculatus
- Scarabaeus cancer
- Scarabaeus carinatus
- Scarabaeus catenatus
- Scarabaeus cicatricosus
- Scarabaeus clanceyi
- Scarabaeus clericus
- Scarabaeus cognatus
- Scarabaeus confusus
- Scarabaeus convexus
- Scarabaeus cristatus
- Scarabaeus cupreus
- Scarabaeus cuvieri
- Scarabaeus damarensis
- Scarabaeus deludens
- Scarabaeus denticollis
- Scarabaeus devotus
- Scarabaeus dioscoridis
- Scarabaeus ebenus
- Scarabaeus endroedyi
- Scarabaeus erichsoni
- Scarabaeus festivus
- Scarabaeus fitzsimonsi
- Scarabaeus flavicornis
- Scarabaeus fraterculus
- Scarabaeus fritschi
- Scarabaeus funebris
- Scarabaeus furcatus
- Scarabaeus galenus
- Scarabaeus gangeticus
- Scarabaeus gariepinus
- Scarabaeus gilleti
- Scarabaeus glentoni
- Scarabaeus goryi
- Scarabaeus gracai
- Scarabaeus heqvisti
- Scarabaeus hippocrates
- Scarabaeus hottentorum
- Scarabaeus inoportunus
- Scarabaeus inquisitus
- Scarabaeus intermedius
- Scarabaeus interstitialis
- Scarabaeus intricatus
- Scarabaeus irakensis
- Scarabaeus isidis
- Scarabaeus jalof
- Scarabaeus janssensi
- Scarabaeus karlwerneri
- Scarabaeus karrooensis
- Scarabaeus knobeli
- Scarabaeus kochi
- Scarabaeus kwiluensis
- Scarabaeus laevifrons
- Scarabaeus laevistriatus
- Scarabaeus lamarcki
- Scarabaeus laticollis
- Scarabaeus licitus
- Scarabaeus lucidulus
- Scarabaeus multidentatus
- Scarabaeus namibicus
- Scarabaeus natalensis
- Scarabaeus nigroaeneus
- Scarabaeus nitidicollis
- Scarabaeus obsoletepunctatus
- Scarabaeus opacipennis
- Scarabaeus pabulator
- Scarabaeus paganus
- Scarabaeus palemo
- Scarabaeus parvulus
- Scarabaeus piliventris
- Scarabaeus pius
- Scarabaeus planifrons
- Scarabaeus platynotus
- Scarabaeus plausibilis
- Scarabaeus poggei
- Scarabaeus porosus
- Scarabaeus proboscideus
- Scarabaeus prodigiosus
- Scarabaeus puncticollis
- Scarabaeus pustulosus
- Scarabaeus radama
- Scarabaeus ritchiei
- Scarabaeus rixosus
- Scarabaeus rodriguesi
- Scarabaeus rotundigenus
- Scarabaeus rubripennis
- Scarabaeus rugosus
- Scarabaeus rusticus
- Scarabaeus sacer
- Scarabaeus sanctus
- Scarabaeus satyrus
- Scarabaeus savignyi
- Scarabaeus schinzi
- Scarabaeus scholtzi
- Scarabaeus schulzeae
- Scarabaeus semipunctatus
- Scarabaeus sennaariensis
- Scarabaeus sevoistra
- Scarabaeus silenus
- Scarabaeus spretus
- Scarabaeus striatus
- Scarabaeus subaeneus
- Scarabaeus sulcipennis
- Scarabaeus suri
- Scarabaeus tonckeri
- Scarabaeus transcaspicus
- Scarabaeus typhon
- Scarabaeus valeflorae
- Scarabaeus vanderkelleni
- Scarabaeus vansoni
- Scarabaeus variolosus
- Scarabaeus venerabilis
- Scarabaeus westwoodi
- Scarabaeus vethi
- Scarabaeus viator
- Scarabaeus vicinus
- Scarabaeus viettei
- Scarabaeus wilsoni
- Scarabaeus winkleri
- Scarabaeus xavieri
- Scarabaeus zagrosensis
- Scarabaeus zambezianus
- Scarabaeus zurstrasseni
