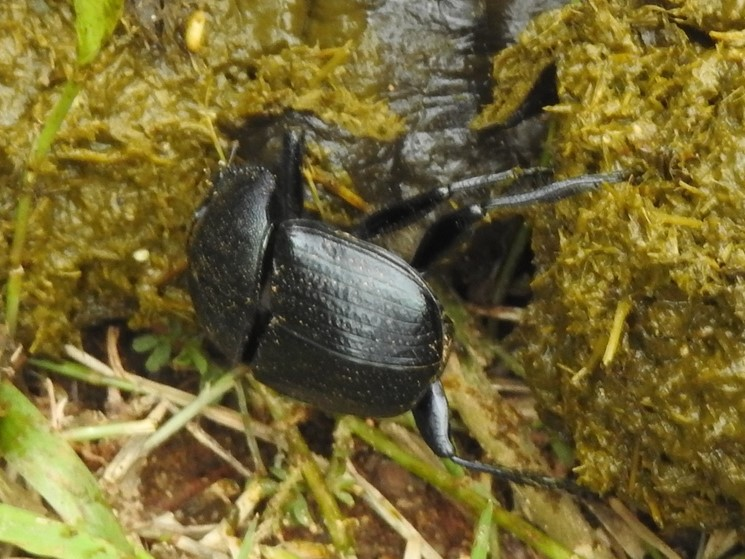

Scientific classification
- Kingdom: Animalia
- Phylum: Arthropoda
- Class: Insecta
- Order: Coleoptera
- Suborder: Polyphaga
- Infraorder: Scarabaeiformia
- Family: Scarabaeidae
- Genus: Scarabaeus
- Species: S. erichsoni

Binomial name
- Scarabaeus erichsoni (Harold, 1867)

Synonyms
- Scarabaeus (Kheper) erichsoni Harold, 1867; Ateuchus erichsoni Harold, 1867

= Scarabaeus erichsoni =

Species of beetle

Scarabaeus erichsoni, is a species of dung beetle found in India, and Sri Lanka. Sometimes, the species is classified as Kheper erichsoni.

== Description ==
The species has an average length of about 21 to 26 mm.
