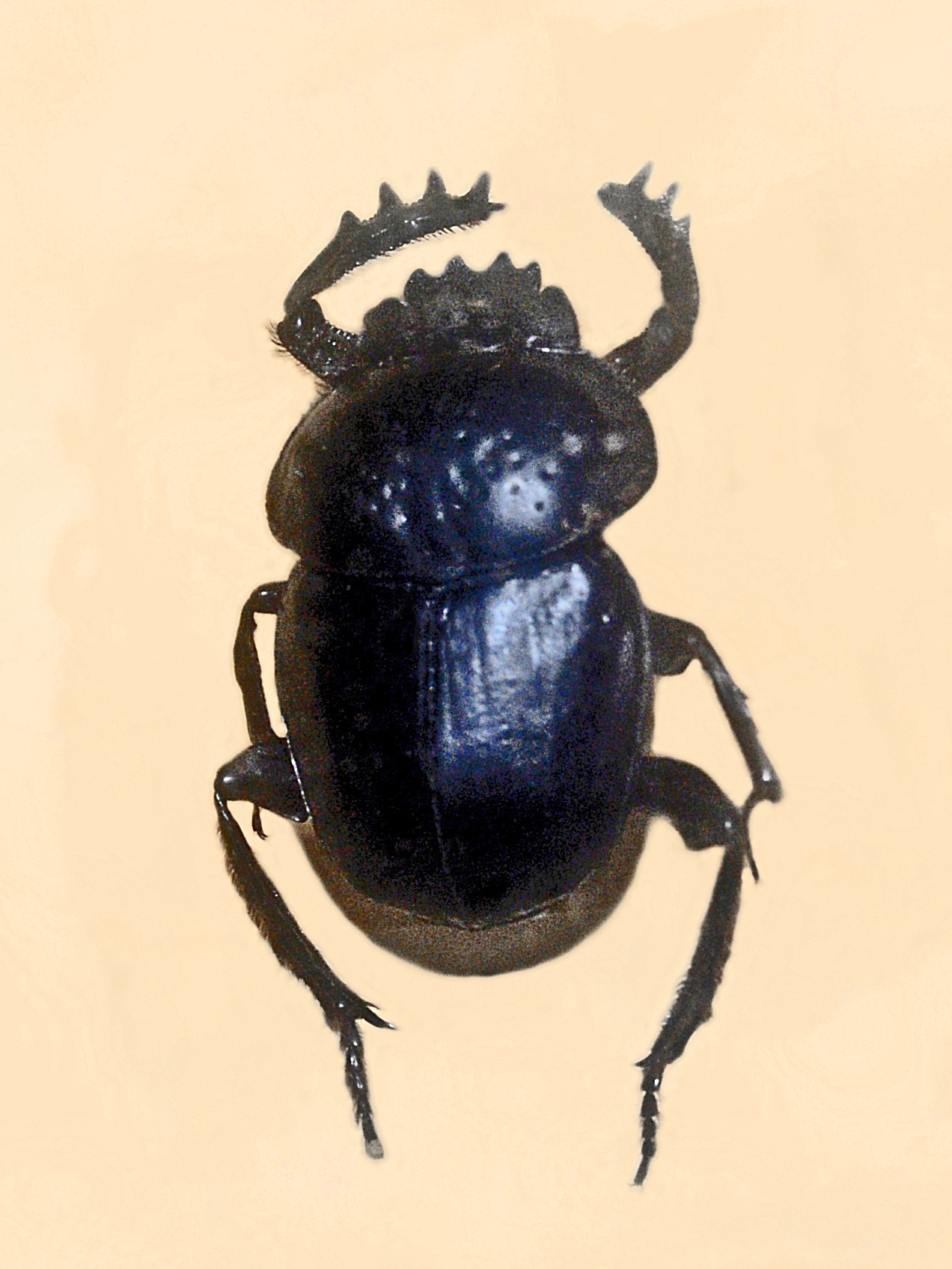

Scientific classification
- Kingdom: Animalia
- Phylum: Arthropoda
- Class: Insecta
- Order: Coleoptera
- Suborder: Polyphaga
- Infraorder: Scarabaeiformia
- Family: Scarabaeidae
- Genus: Scarabaeus
- Species: S. puncticollis

Binomial name
- Scarabaeus puncticollis (Latreille, 1819

Synonyms
- Ateuchetus puncticollis (Latreille, 1819); Scarabaeus hypocrita Castelnau, 1840; Scarabaeus nudifrons Fischer von Waldheim, 1823; Scarabaeus parapunctatus Klug, 1845; Scarabaeus sericeus Motschulsky, 1849

= Scarabaeus puncticollis =

Species of beetle

Scarabaeus puncticollis is a species of beetles belonging to the family Scarabaeidae.

== Description ==
Scarabaeus puncticollis has a distinctive set of points (hence the Latin species name puncticollis) along the basal margin of the pronotum. The head has a characteristic array of six projections, resembling rays. These projections are similar to four more projections on each of the tibiae of the front legs. All these projections are adaptations for digging and for forming balls of dung. The mid- and hind-legs have normal, well-developed 5-segmented tarsi. These beetles feed exclusively on dung.

== Distribution ==
This species is present in Bulgaria, North Macedonia, Portugal, Spain and North Africa.

== Bibliography ==
- Motschulsky V. (1849) Coleopteres recus d'un voyage de M.Handschuch dans le midi de l'Espagne, enumeres et suivis de notes, Bulletin de la Société imperiale des Naturalistes de Moscou. Moscou 22(3):52-163 (99-121)
- Klug J.C.F (1845) Symbolae physicae, seu icones et descriptiones insectorum quae ex itinere per Africam borealem et Asiam occidentalem Federici Guilelmi Hemprich et Christiani Godofredi Ehremberg medicinae et chirurgiae doctorum studio novae aut illustratae redierunt. Bero, Mittler. Berlin
- Castelnau F. (1840) Histoire Naturelle des Insectes Coléoptères. Avec une introduction renfermant L'Anatomie et la Physiologie des Animaux Articulés, par M.Brullé, P.Duménil. Paris 2:1-564
- Fischer von Waldheim G. (1823) Entomographia imperii russici; genera insectorum systematice exposita et analysi iconographica instructa, (1823-1824) 2:1-262 (143-152)(189-218)
- Latreille P.A. (1819) Des insectes peints ou sculpés sur les monuments de l'Egypte, Mémoires du Muséum nationale d'Histoire Naturelle. Paris 5:249-270
- Scarabs: World Scarabaeidae Database. Schoolmeesters P., 2011-05-30
