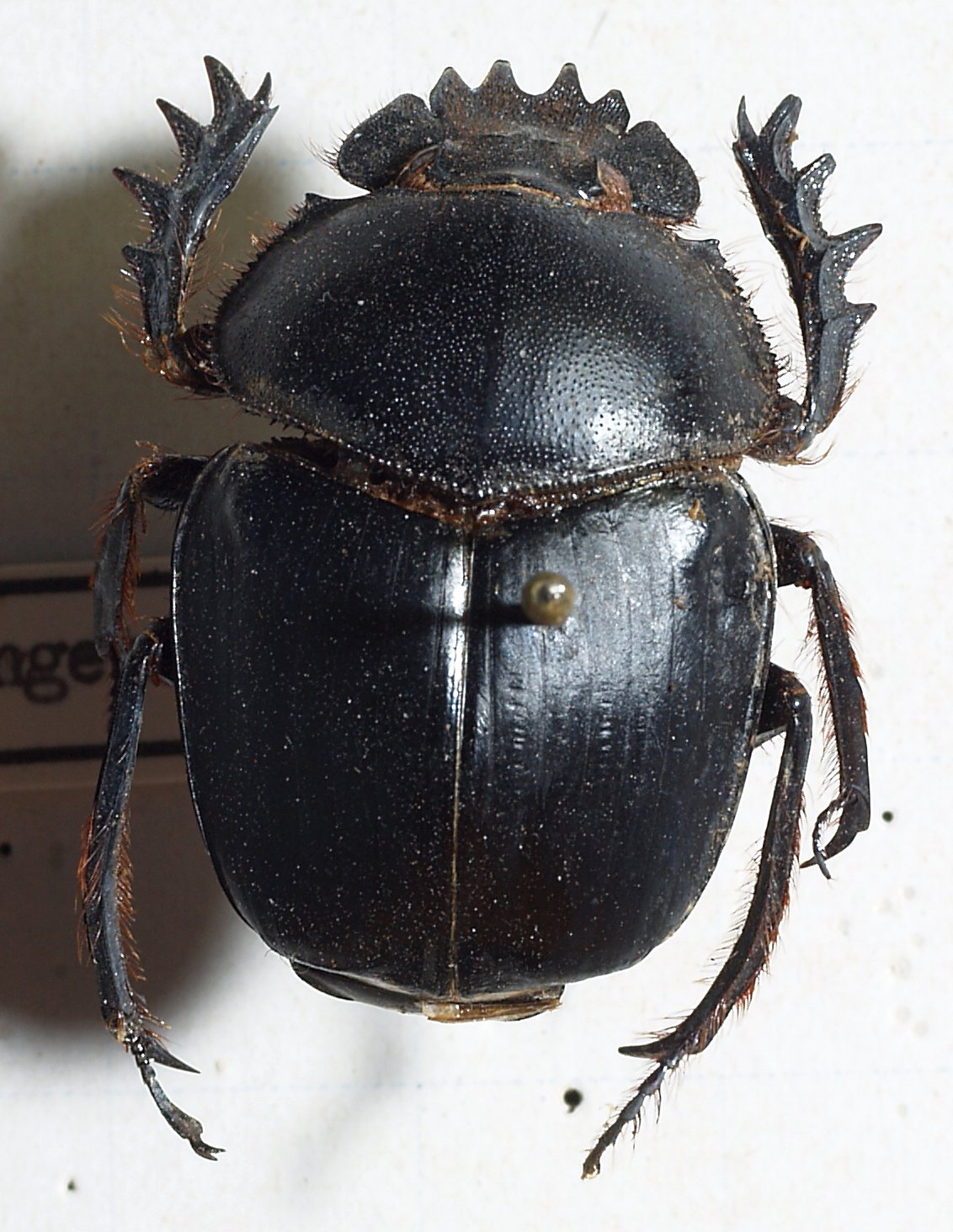

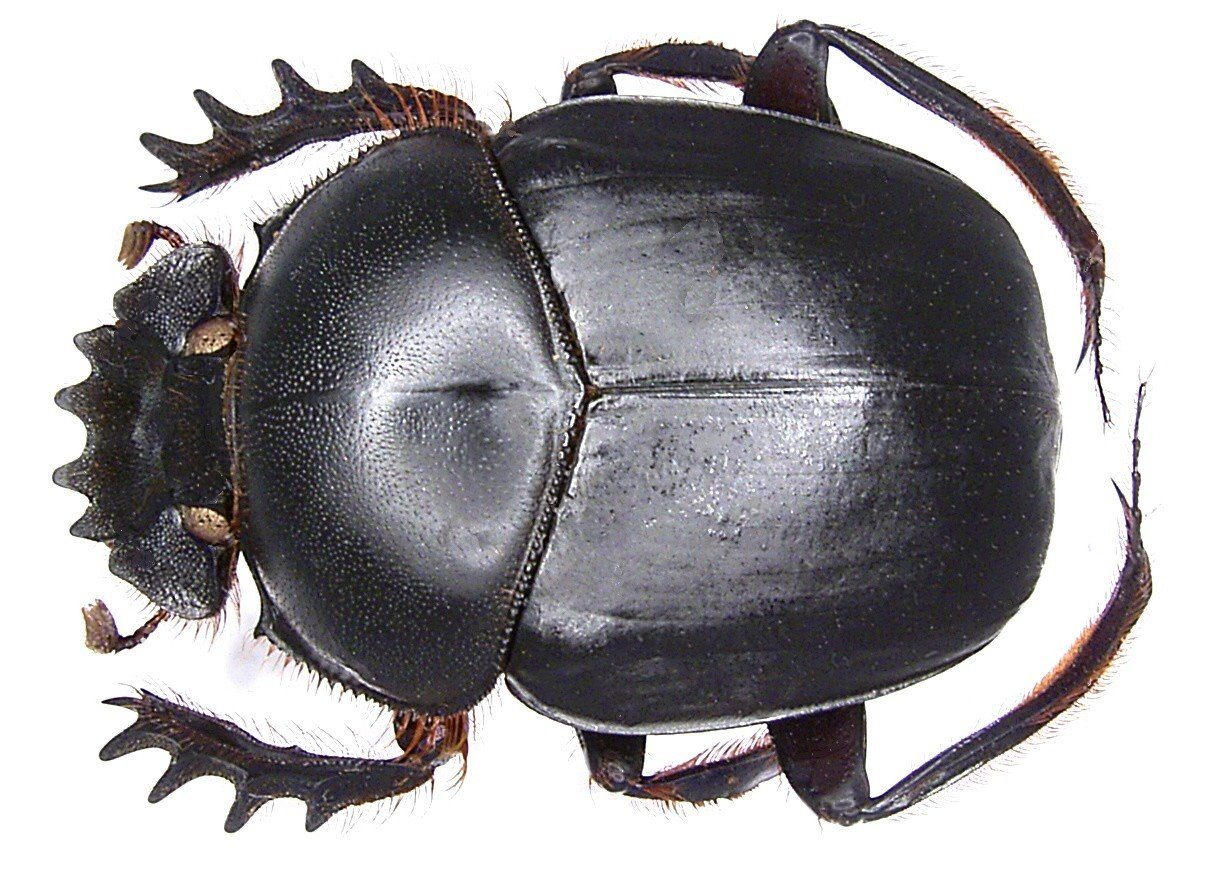

Scientific classification
- Kingdom: Animalia
- Phylum: Arthropoda
- Class: Insecta
- Order: Coleoptera
- Suborder: Polyphaga
- Infraorder: Scarabaeiformia
- Family: Scarabaeidae
- Genus: Scarabaeus
- Species: S. gangeticus

Binomial name
- Scarabaeus gangeticus (Castelnau, 1840)

Synonyms
- Ateuchus gangeticus Castelnau, 1840; Scarabaeus indicus Motschulsky, 1863

= Scarabaeus gangeticus =

Species of beetle

Scarabaeus gangeticus, is a species of dung beetle found in many Indo-African countries including; India, Sri Lanka, Pakistan, Iran, Saudi Arabia, Egypt, Botswana, Ethiopia, Somalia, Uganda and Zimbabwe.

== Description ==
This large broadly oval, slightly convex species has an average length of about 23 to 35 mm. Body black and sub-opaque. Legs and ventrum shiny. Lateral margins of prothorax, legs, and ventrum covered with reddish hair. Head densely and rugosely punctured. Forehead with a slight transverse carina on each side. Clypeus consists with four strong teeth which are separated by rounded notches. Pronotum finely and closely tuberculate. Scutellum not visible. Elytra very finely striate and extremely minutely and sparsely punctured. Pygidium opaque at the base, with shiny apex. Pygidium very sparsely and finely tuberculate. In male, middle tibia has a short internal fringe, whereas female has a long internal fringe.

Adults are commonly found from fresh cow dungs. The parasite Tarsopolipus bisetalus is observed from the adults in Botswana.
