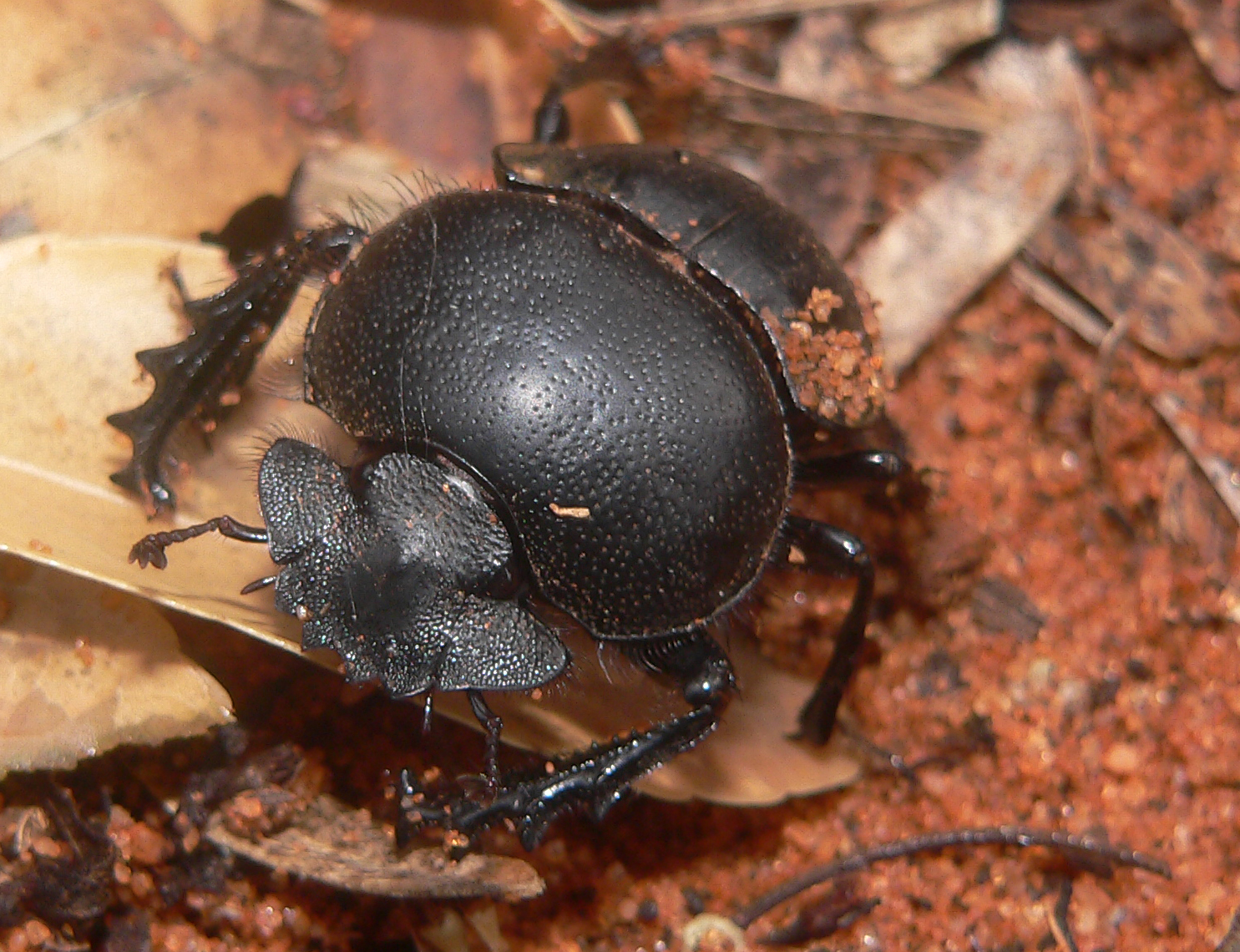

Scientific classification
- Kingdom: Animalia
- Phylum: Arthropoda
- Class: Insecta
- Order: Coleoptera
- Suborder: Polyphaga
- Infraorder: Scarabaeiformia
- Family: Scarabaeidae
- Genus: Scarabaeus
- Species: S. viettei

Binomial name
- Scarabaeus viettei (Paulian, 1953)

Synonyms
- Madateuchus viettei Paulian, 1953

= Scarabaeus viettei =

Species of beetle

Scarabaeus viettei, or Viette's scarab beetle, is a species of dung beetle in the family Scarabaeidae, subfamily Scarabaeinae. It was first described by French entomologist Renaud Paulian in 1953. The species is endemic to Madagascar, with its known range restricted to the dry spiny forests of the island's western region.

== Appearance ==
Adult S.viettei beetles exhibit a robust, rounded body typical of scarabaeines; individuals measure about 20 to 30 mm (0.8 to 1.2 in) in length. The exoskeleton is black and glossy, with reddish-brown setae distributed along the lateral and ventral surfaces. The antennae of males are composed of nine antennomeres, terminating in a lamellate club used for detecting odors. Sexual dimorphism is present, as males may exhibit more pronounced forelegs and possess horn-like structures on the head or thorax, which are typically used in intraspecific combat and mate competition.

== Behavior ==
Like other members of its genus, S.viettei plays a crucial role in nutrient cycling and soil aeration. Adults are coprophagous, collecting and burying dung for feeding and reproduction. The species is primarily active during the early morning and late afternoon, avoiding peak daytime heat. Reproductive behavior involves the construction of brood balls, into which eggs are laid and larvae develop.

== Lifecycle ==
Upon hatching, the larva feeds on the dung within the ball, undergoing several molts as it grows. This larval stage is characterized by a soft, grub-like body adapted for consuming organic matter. After completing its development, the larva enters the pupal stage, during which it undergoes transformation into an adult beetle. The adult then emerges from the soil and continues the cycle.
