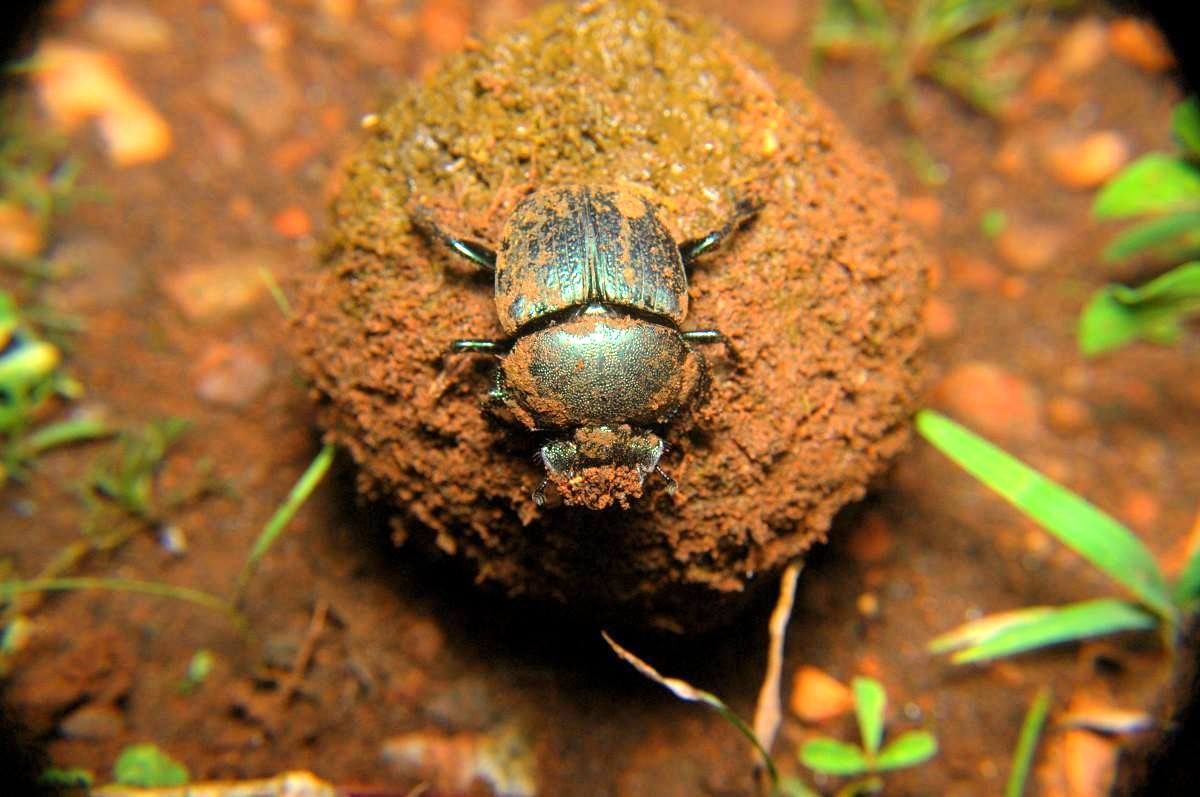

Scientific classification
- Kingdom: Animalia
- Phylum: Arthropoda
- Class: Insecta
- Order: Coleoptera
- Suborder: Polyphaga
- Infraorder: Scarabaeiformia
- Family: Scarabaeidae
- Genus: Scarabaeus
- Species: S. sanctus

Binomial name
- Scarabaeus sanctus (Fabricius 1798)

Synonyms
- Copris sanctus Fabricius, 1798; Kheper sanctus (Fabricius, 1798)

= Scarabaeus sanctus =

Species of beetle

Scarabaeus sanctus, is a species of dung beetle found in India, and Sri Lanka.

The species has a length of about 21 to 26 mm.
