= Scarabaeus laticollis =

Scientific classification
- Kingdom: Animalia
- Phylum: Arthropoda
- Clade: Pancrustacea
- Class: Insecta
- Order: Coleoptera
- Suborder: Polyphaga
- Infraorder: Scarabaeiformia
- Family: Scarabaeidae
- Genus: Scarabaeus
- Species: S. laticollis

Binomial name
- Scarabaeus laticollis Linnaeus, 1767

Species of beetle

Scarabaeus laticollis is a species of dung beetle in the genus Scarabaeus.

== Description ==
Scarabaeus laticollis is a species of dung beetle in the genus Scarabaeus. Being a dung beetle, Scarabaeus laticollis primarily feeds on the dung of herbivores and omnivores. They also eat the remnants of dead plants.
