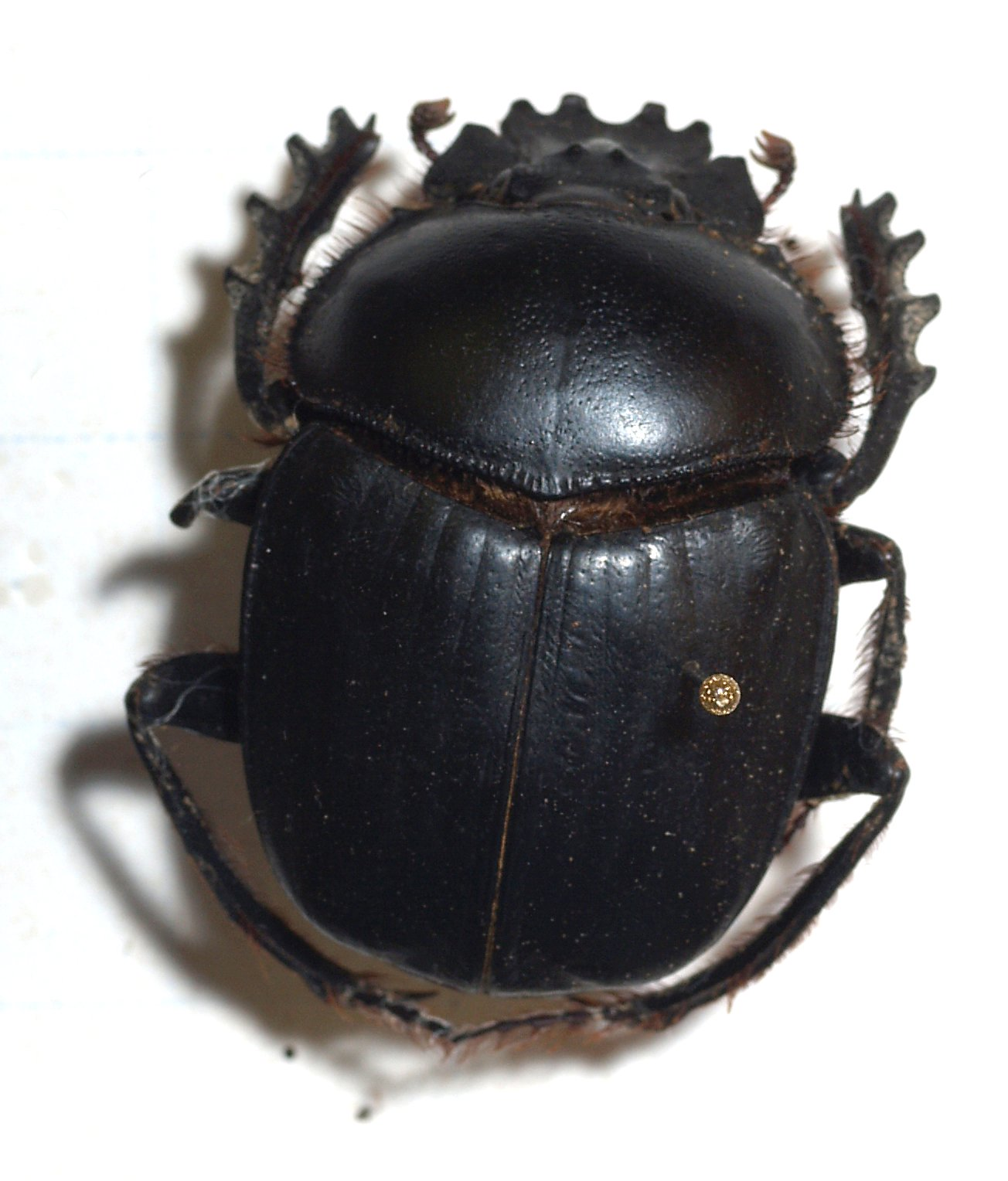

Scientific classification
- Kingdom: Animalia
- Phylum: Arthropoda
- Clade: Pancrustacea
- Class: Insecta
- Order: Coleoptera
- Suborder: Polyphaga
- Infraorder: Scarabaeiformia
- Family: Scarabaeidae
- Subfamily: Scarabaeinae
- Tribe: Scarabaeini
- Genus: Scarabaeus
- Subgenus: S. (Scarabeus)
- Species: S. sacer

Binomial name
- Scarabaeus sacer Linnaeus, 1758

= Scarabaeus sacer =

Species of beetle

Scarabaeus sacer, common name sacred scarab, is the type species of the genus Scarabaeus and the family Scarabaeidae. This dung beetle is native to southern Europe, North Africa, West Asia, and was venerated in ancient Egypt.

== Taxonomy ==
Scarabaeus sacer was described by Carl Linnaeus in his 1758 10th edition of Systema Naturae, the starting point of zoological nomenclature. It is considered the type species of the genus Scarabaeus, despite some controversy surrounding Latreille's 1810 type designation, which was resolved by a ruling of the International Commission on Zoological Nomenclature in 2014, to accept Hope's 1837 designation of S. sacer as the type rather than Latreille's 1810 designation (of Dynastes hercules).

== Distribution and habitat ==
Scarabaeus sacer is found in southern Europe, North Africa, and West Asia. It has been recorded from Afghanistan, Albania, Armenia, Azerbaijan, Bulgaria, Cyprus, Egypt, Eritrea, Ethiopia, France (including Corsica), Greece, Hungary, Iran, Iraq, Israel, Italy (including Sardinia and Sicily), Jordan, India (Kashmir), Libya, Mauritania, Montenegro, Morocco, Palestine, Pakistan, Romania, Portugal, Russia (southernmost), Saudi Arabia, Serbia, Spain, Sudan, Syria, Turkey, Turkistan and Ukraine. In Europe, much of the distribution of S. sacer is in coastal regions near the Mediterranean and the Black Sea, where it often inhabits dunes and marshes. For example, in the Camargue, it is almost exclusively found in coastal dunes and coastal marshes.

== Description ==
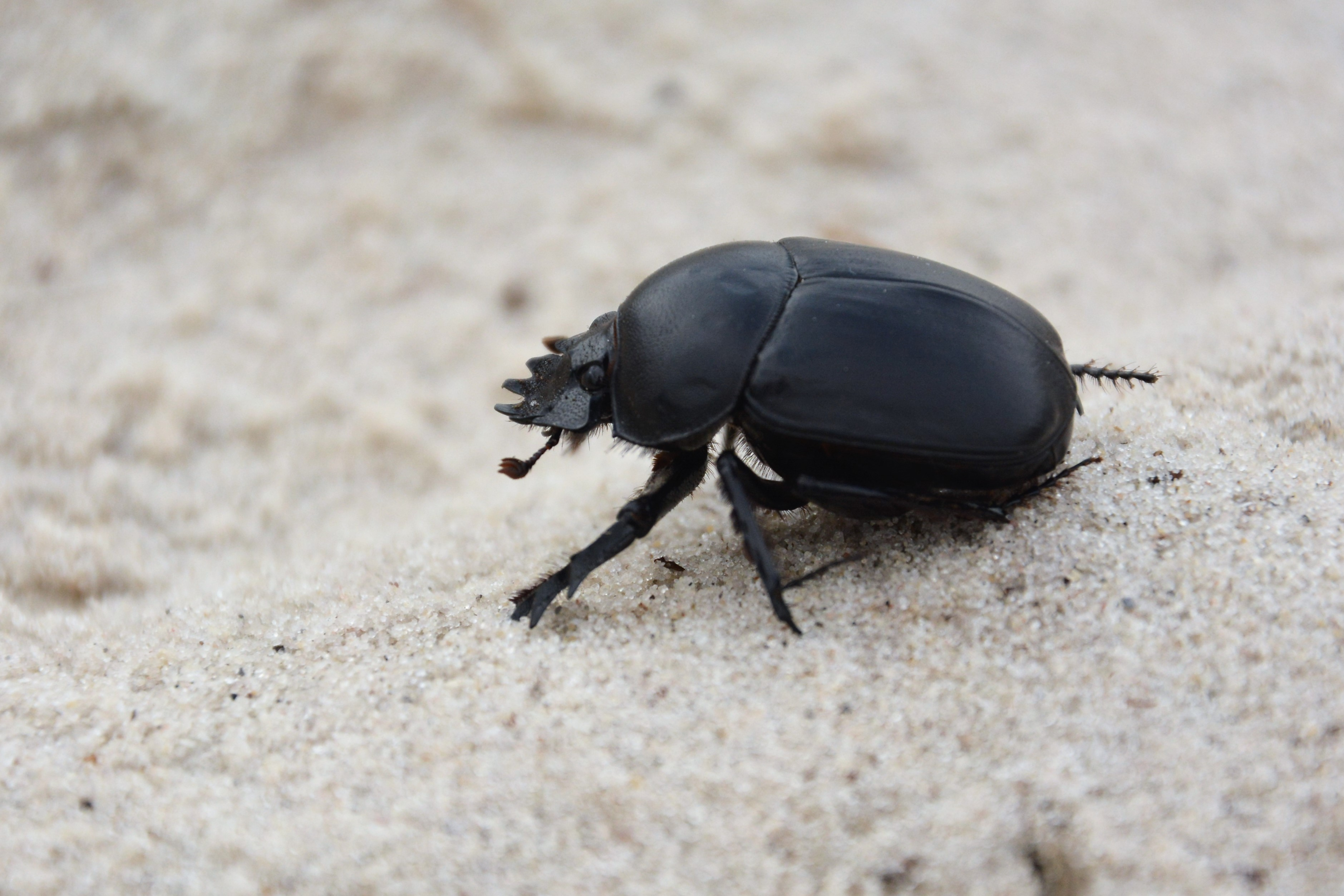
Scarabaeus sacer in coastal southwestern Ukraine

Scarabaeus sacer is a robust, all-black beetle where adults are 1.9–4.0 cm (0.7–1.6 in) long. The head has a distinctive array of six projections, resembling rays. The projections are uniform with four more projections on each of the tibiae of the front legs, creating an arc of 14 "rays" (see illustration). Functionally, the projections are adaptations for digging and for shaping the ball of dung.

Like the front legs of other beetles of its genus, but unlike those of dung beetles in most other genera, the front legs of S. sacer are unusual; they do not end in any recognisable tarsi, the foot that bears the claws. There is only a vestigial claw-like structure that might be of some assistance in digging. The mid- and hindlegs of Scarabaeus have normal, well-developed, five-segmented tarsi, but the front legs are specialised for excavation and for forming balls of dung.

== Life cycle and ecology ==
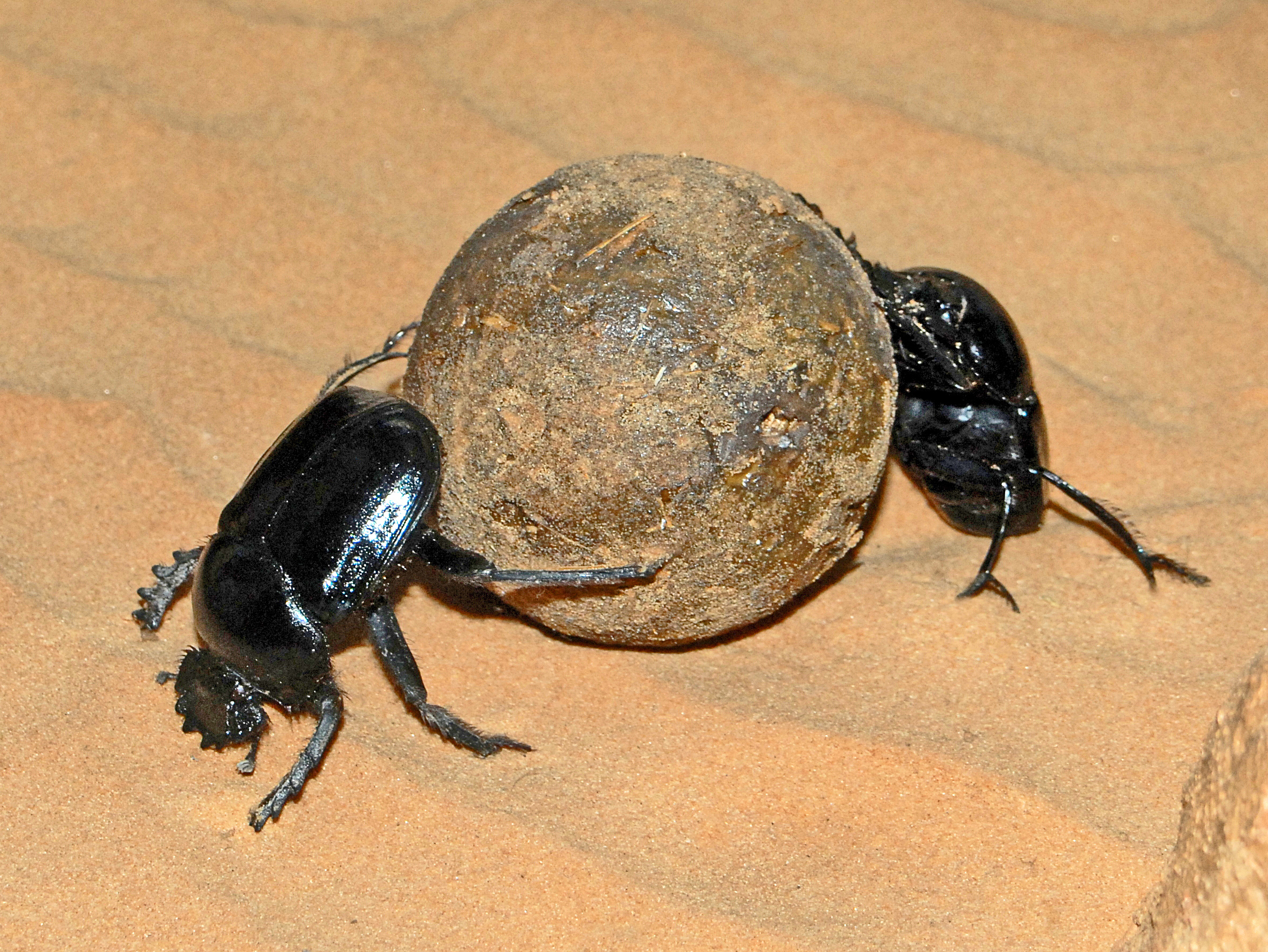
S. sacer rolling a ball of dung

Among the coprophagous species of beetles, Sc. sacer is typical of those that collect dung into balls, which also are known as telecoprids. Such a beetle rolls its ball to a suitable location, where it digs an underground chamber in which it hides the ball. It then eats the ball itself, a process that may take several days.

When the female is ready to breed, she selects especially fine-textured dung to make her breeding ball, and digs an especially deep and large chamber for it. There, she sculpts it into a pear shape with a hollow cavity in the narrow part. In that cavity, she lays a single, large egg. She then seals the cavity and departs to repeat the process elsewhere. Typically, a successful female S. sacer produces only about half a dozen young in her life. The larva feeds on the ball of dung after the egg hatches.

Scarabaeus sacer serves as the host for the phoretic mite Macrocheles saceri.

== Human significance ==
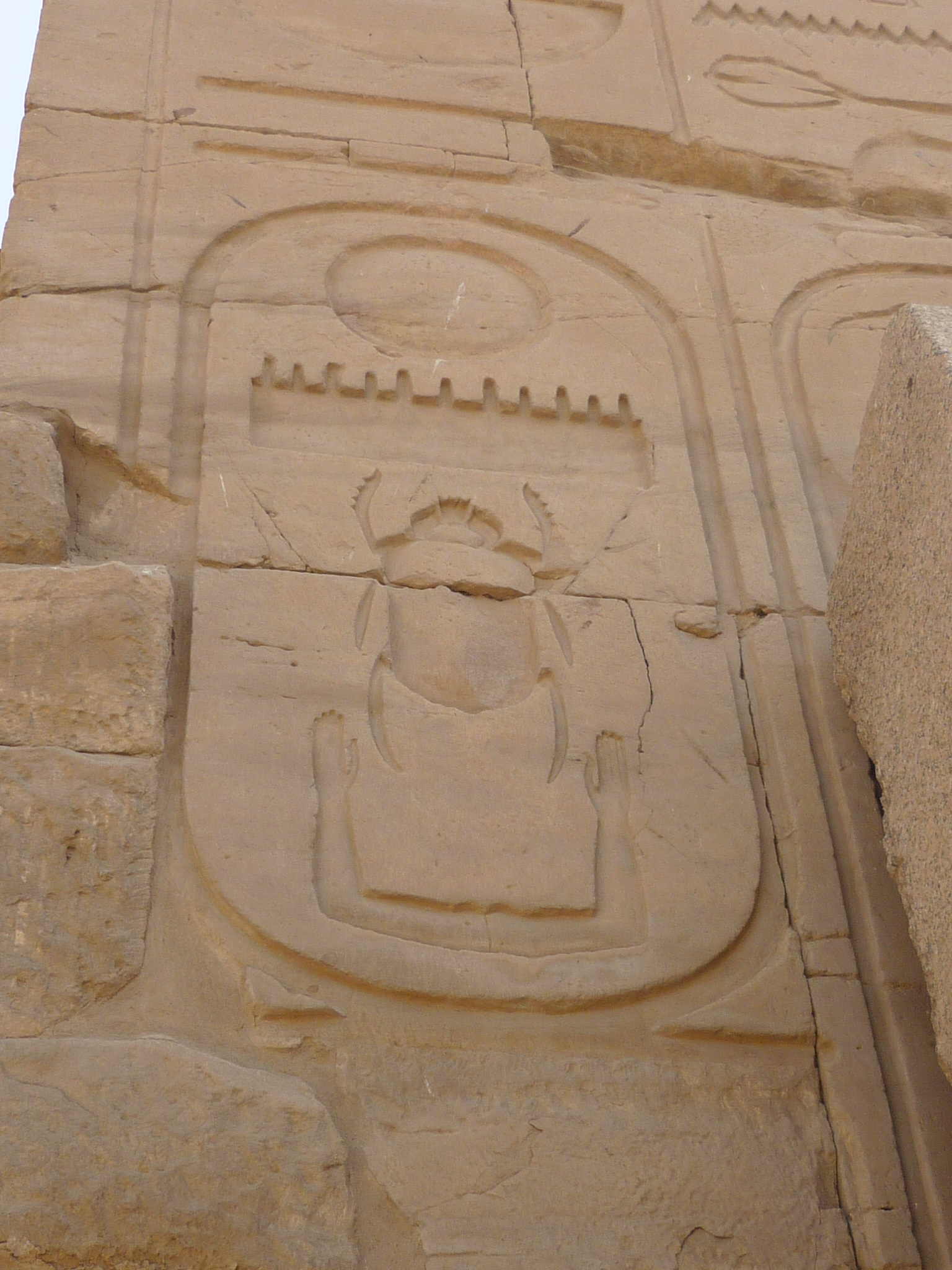
Carved relief of the cartouche representing Thutmose III on the wall of the Precinct of Amun-Re, Karnak

Scarabaeus sacer is the most famous of the scarab beetles. To the Ancient Egyptians, S. sacer was a symbol of Khepri, the early morning manifestation of the sun god Ra, from an analogy between the beetle's behaviour of rolling a ball of dung across the ground and Khepri's task of rolling the sun across the sky. They accordingly held the species to be sacred.

The Egyptians also observed young beetles emerging from the ball of dung, from which they mistakenly inferred that the male beetle was able to reproduce without needing a female, simply by injecting his sperm into the ball of dung. From this, they drew parallels with their god Atum, who also begat children alone.

Scarabaeus sacer was the species which first piqued the interest of William Sharp Macleay and drew him into a career in entomology.

== See also ==
- Scarab in Ancient Egypt
  - Scarab (artifact)
