= Denver Museum of Nature and Science =

Museum in Denver, Colorado, U.S.

Coordinates: 39°44′51″N 104°56′33″W

Denver Museum of Nature & Science

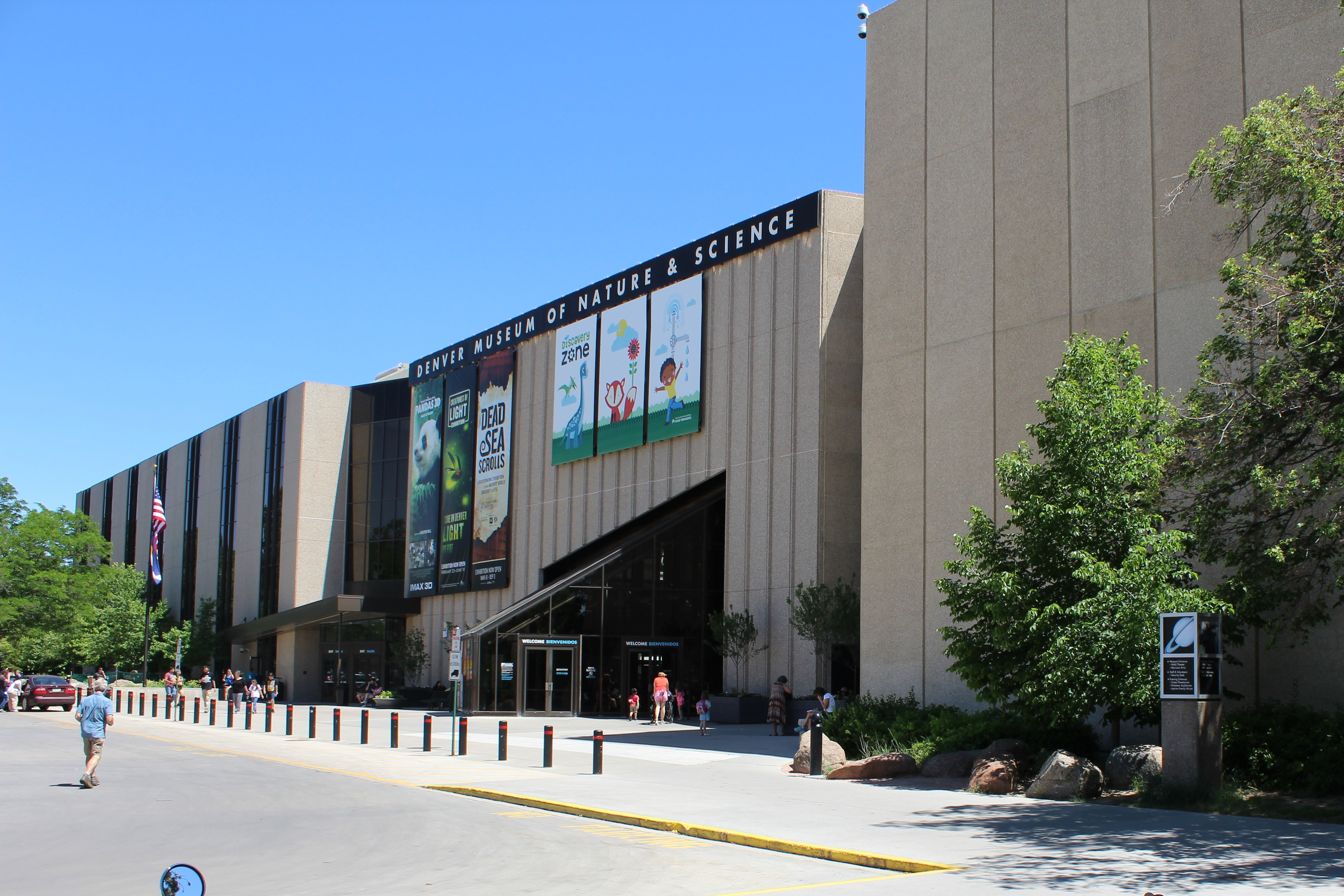
- Denver Museum of Nature & Science
- Established: December 6, 1900 (125 years ago)
- Location: Denver, Colorado
- Type: Natural History
- Accreditation: American Alliance of Museums
- Visitors: 1,151,000 (2022)
- President: George Sparks
- Website: www.dmns.org

The Denver Museum of Nature & Science (DMNS) is a municipal natural history and science museum in Denver, Colorado. It is a resource for informal science education in the Rocky Mountain region. A variety of exhibitions, programs, and activities help museum visitors learn about the natural history of Colorado, Earth, and the universe. The 716,000-square-foot (66,519 m^{2}) building houses more than one million objects in its collections including natural history and anthropological materials, as well as archival and library resources.

The museum is an independent, nonprofit institution with approximately 450 full-time and part-time staff, more than 67 volunteers, and a 67-member board of trustees. It is accredited by the American Alliance of Museums and is a Smithsonian Institution affiliate.

In 1967, the museum received 1,151,000 visitors, ranking eighteenth in the List of most-visited museums in the United States. It was the fourth-most-visited U.S. museum of nature and science. The museum's official online magazine is called Catalyst.

== Education programs ==
VOA report about the museum

The museum provides programming in six main areas. The exhibitions, Infinity Theater films, lectures, classes, and programs pertaining to one or more of the following core subjects: anthropology, geology, anatomy, paleontology, astronomy, and zoology. More than 300,000 students and teachers visit the museum with school groups each year. In addition, the museum has science outreach programs and distance–learning opportunities for families, schools and surrounding communities. The museum also offers ongoing professional training workshops for teachers.

== History ==
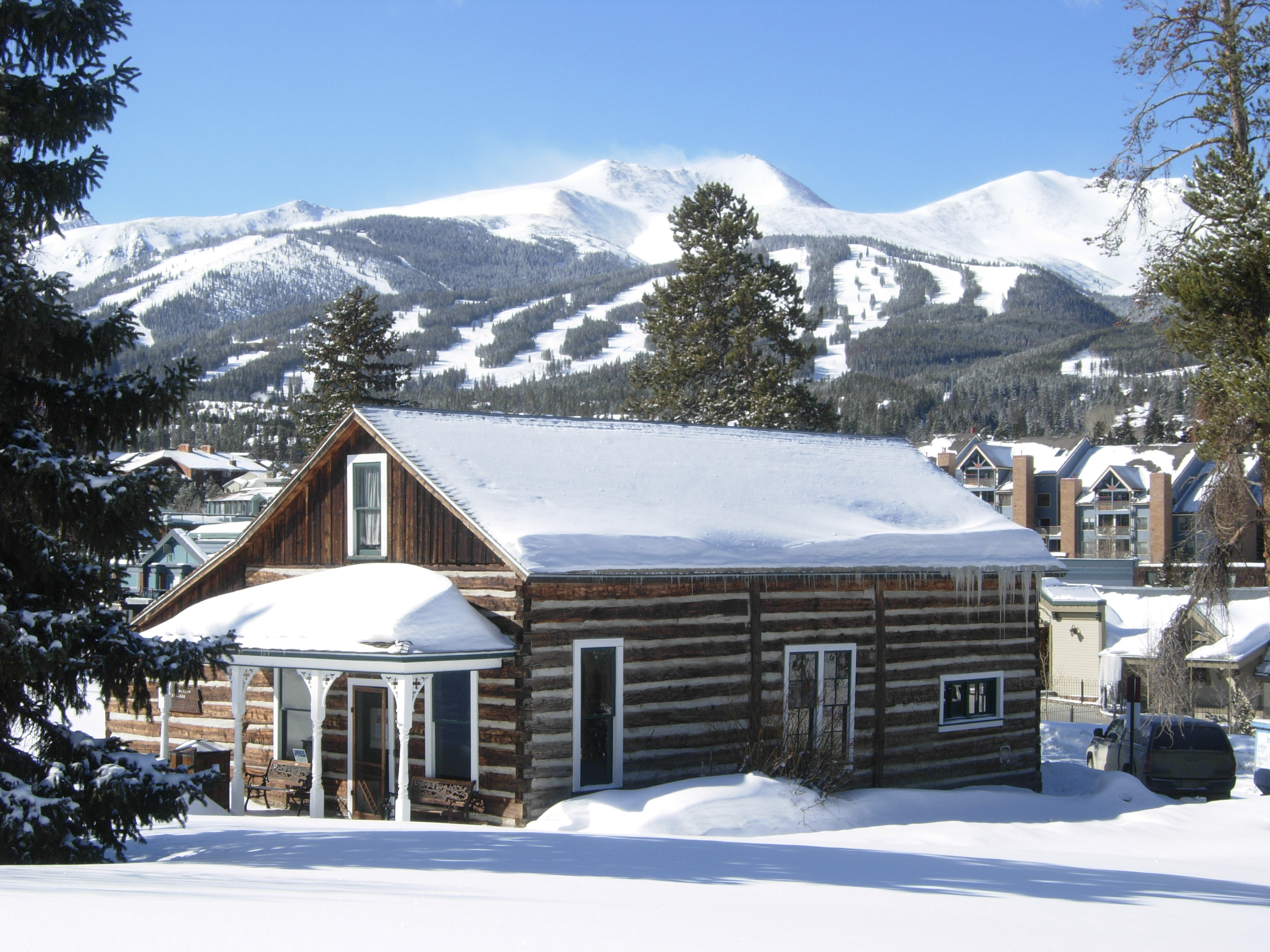
Edwin Carter Log Cabin Naturalist Museum (c. 1875), Breckenridge, Colorado

In 1868, Edwin Carter moved into a tiny cabin in Breckenridge, Colorado, to pursue his passion, the scientific study of the birds and mammals of the Rocky Mountains. Almost single-handedly, Carter assembled one of the most complete collections of Colorado fauna then in existence.

Word of Carter's collection spread and, in 1892, a group of prominent Denver citizens declared their interest in moving his collection to the capital city for all to see. Carter offered to sell the entire collection for $10,000. The founders also secured a collection of butterflies and moths, and a collection of crystallized gold.

Together, these three collections formed the nucleus of what would become the Colorado Museum of Natural History, officially incorporated on December 6, 1900. After years of preparation and construction, the Colorado Museum of Natural History finally opened to the public on July 1, 1908. John F. Campion, the first president of the board, said in his dedication address, "A museum of natural history is never finished". The first director was hired and quickly recruited staff to build more exhibits and create public programs. By 1918, another wing had opened and research efforts were well underway.

In 1927, a team led by the Colorado Museum discovered two stone projectile points embedded in an extinct species of bison, in Folsom, New Mexico. These Folsom points demonstrated that humans had lived in North America more than 10,000 years ago, hundreds of years earlier than previously believed.

The city of Denver increased its funding for the museum, leading to a name change to Denver Museum of Natural History in 1948. The name was changed again in 2000 to the present Denver Museum of Nature and Science, reflecting the institution's wider focus.

The museum is partially funded by the Scientific and Cultural Facilities District (SCFD), which was created by area voters in 1988. It has also attracted large donations from benefactors, such as Morgridge Family Foundation led by philanthropist Carrie Morgridge, which gave $8 million to the museum in 2010, described as being the largest single gift since its founding.

On July 9, 2025, the museum reported that they had a core sample dug up from the parking lot, in order to assess the possibility of utilizing geothermal heating. To the surprise of the museum staff, the sample contained a fragment of a dinosaur fossil 763 feet (233 meters) below the surface. Though unable to identify the species, the staff believe it to be a vertebra of a herbivorous ornithopod. The institution's geology curator wanted to dig up the parking lot to excavate it, but was not allowed to.

I would love to dig a 763-foot (233-meter) hole in the parking lot to excavate that dinosaur, the rest of it. But I don’t think that’s going to fly because we really need parking... Unfortunately, we can’t excavate our entire parking lot. Parking is really important at the museum and in all cultural (centers )... But the bonus here is that people can now park right on top of a dinosaur.

— James Hagadorn, curator of geology

== Permanent exhibits ==
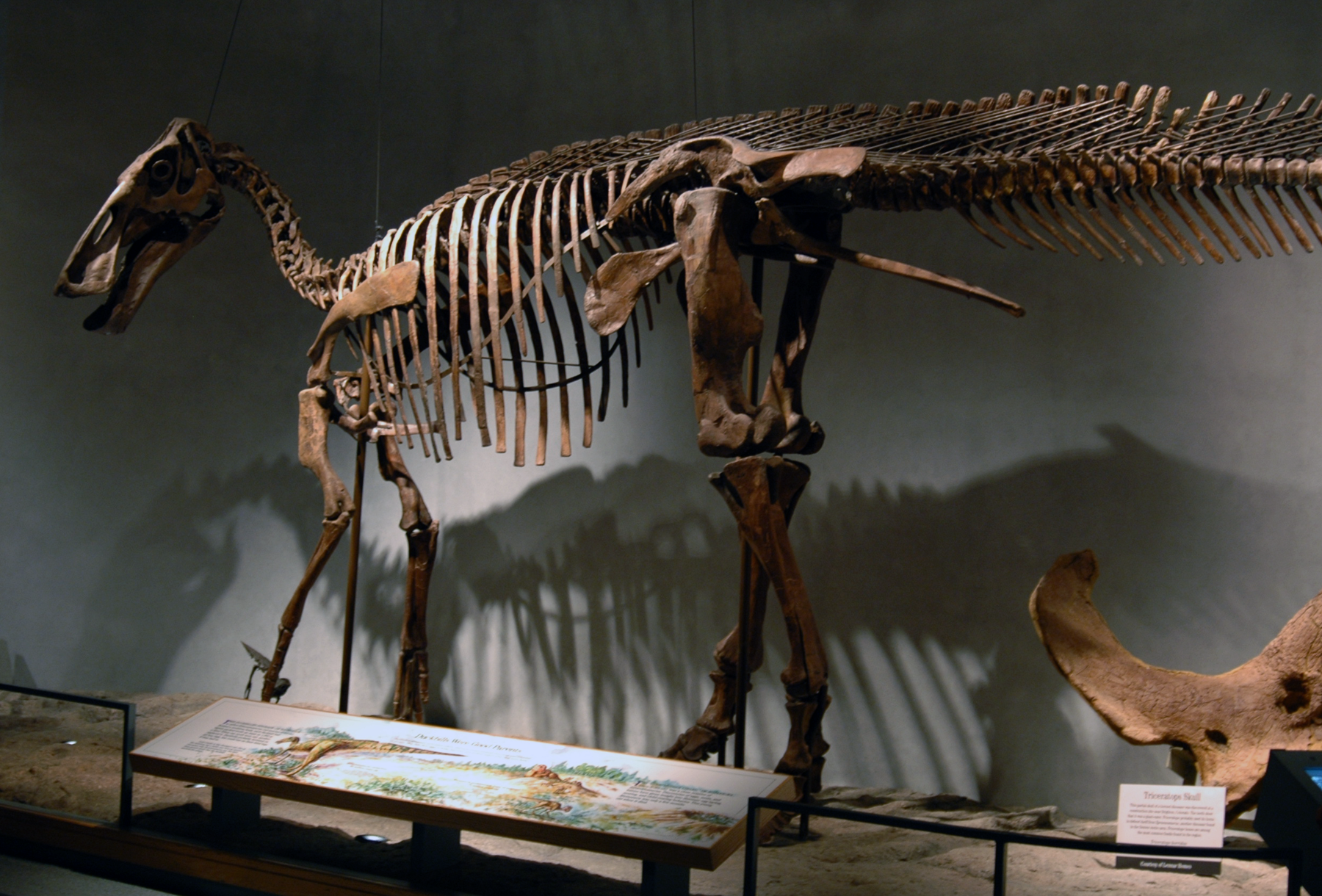
Skeleton of Edmontosaurus

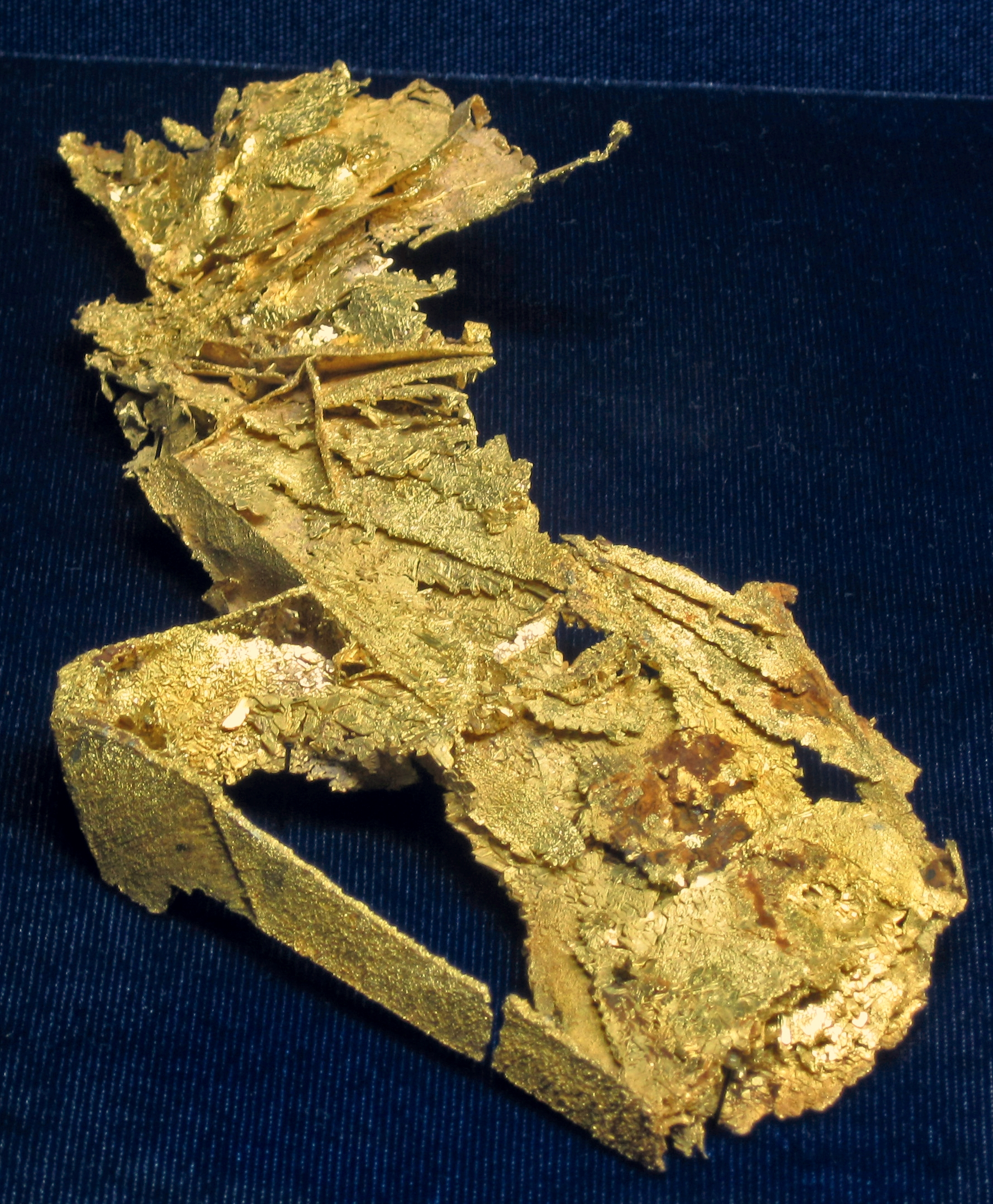
Crystalline gold from Farncomb Hill, near Breckenridge, Colorado.

Saber Tooth Coin Display at Denver Museum of Nature and Science

Expedition Health

Expedition Health teaches visitors about the human body, including the science of taste. It opened on March 30, 2009, replacing the former Hall of Life. Expedition Health was made in support from Kaiser Permanente.

Space Odyssey

Space Odyssey, which opened in 2003 and underwent a refurbishment in 2020, is about the Universe and our place in it. One major highlight of the exhibit is a full-scale replica of a Mars Exploration Rover, which was formerly found outside the exhibit from around 2004 to around 2016 or 2017. Towards the back of the exhibit is a corridor that features a room with 11,000 bright dots which represent stars in the night sky. This room is connected to the Fantasy Spaceship which is a life sized fantasy spaceship featuring boosters, a large screen that displays the spaceship's current position in the simulation, and a fuel station where visitors can power the ship's light speed boosters. Past the main ship's control room there is a long corridor with 2 rooms and one small "vent" where younger visitors can crawl through. These two rooms consist of a puzzle.

Prehistoric Journey

Prehistoric Journey, which opened in 1995, traces the evolution of life on Earth. Displays include skeletons and skulls of prehistoric animals (synapsids, dinosaurs and others): Dimetrodon, Eryops, Allosaurus, Stegosaurus, Diplodocus, Edmontosaurus, Maiasaura, Megacerops, Archaeotherium, Hyaenodon, Merycoidodon, Stenomylus, Merycochoerus, Moropus, Dinohyus, Hesperotestudo, Gomphotherium, Synthetoceras and Teleoceras, a sea lily reef diorama from 435 million years ago, a cast/replica skull of the ancient placoderm fish, Dunkleosteus, and a collection of trilobites.

Some fossil bone of a dinosaur in this exhibition was found in 2025 at a depth of 763 feet under the parking lot of the museum, while drilling test for geothermal energy sources.

The entrance to Prehistoric Journey features an animation of the formation which features a constellation of one of the eight secret elves spread throughout the museum.

Wildlife Halls

The Wildlife Halls are animal dioramas showing scenes of daily life of many different animals, one of the largest collections of its type in North America. The Wildlife Halls in the museum are:

Level 3 Wildlife Halls:

Birds of the Americas

Species and locations represented in Birds of the Americas
Mexico	Red-billed tropicbird	Heermann's gull	Brown noddy	American oystercatcher	Brown booby	Blue-footed booby	Magnificent frigatebird				
British Guyana	Hoatzin	Scarlet ibis									
Weld County, Colorado	Mallard	Pintail									
Yuma County, Colorado	Greater prairie-chicken										
Holt County, Missouri	Snow geese										
Morgan County, Colorado	Bald eagle										
Monroe County, Florida	Great white heron	American crocodile	Eastern diamondback rattlesnake	Tricolored heron							
Monte Vista National Wildlife Refuge, Colorado	Sandhill crane										
Guatemala	Spot-crowned woodcreeper	Mountain trogon	Blue-throated motmot	Rufous-collared robin	Guatemala junco	Emerald toucanet	Green violet-ear	Unicolored jay	Pink-headed warbler	Resplendent quetzal	Black-throated jay

Explore Colorado (also known as Explore Colorado: From Plains to Peaks)

Species and locations represented in Explore Colorado: From Plains to Peaks
Weld County, Colorado	Tiger swallowtail	Black-billed magpie	Virginia rail	Dragonfly	Yellow-headed blackbird	Red-winged blackbird	American bittern	Common yellow-throat	Mallard	American avocet	Pronghorn antelope	Thirteen-lined ground squirrel	Wilson's phalarope	Black-tailed prairie dog	Chestnut-collared longspur	Coyote	McCown's longspur	Wood nymph	Horned lark	Mountain plover	Western meadowlark	Uncas skipper butterfly	Lark bunting	Black-tailed jackrabbit
Arapahoe County, Colorado	Great blue heron	Snowy egret	Black-crowned night heron																					
Routt County, Colorado	Milbert's tortoiseshell butterfly	Orange sulpher butterfly	Sage grouse	Sage thrasher	Nuttall's sheep moth																			
Douglas County, Colorado	Scrub jay	Nuttall's cottontail	Sharp-tailed grouse	Rufous-sided towhee	Buck moth	Bandtailed pigeon																		
Custer County, Colorado	Deer mouse	Wild turkey																						
Ouray County, Colorado	Pine grosbeak	Fritillary butterfly	Long-horned beetle	Blue grouse	Phoebus parnassian butterfly	Red squirrel or chickaree	Brown creeper	Dark-eyed junco	Warbling vireo	Gray jay														
Summit County, Colorado	Marten	Least chipmunk	Clark's nutcracker	Lincoln's sparrow	Wilson's warbler	White-crowned sparrow																		
Larimer County, Colorado	Water pipit	Pika	Yellow-bellied marmot	Phoebus parnassian butterfly	Bruce's checkerspot	White-tailed ptarmigan																		
Montezuma County, Colorado	Green-tailed towhee	Tarantula hawk wasp	Tarantula	Scaled quail	Blue-gray gnatcatcher	Collared lizard	Common bushtit	Plain titmouse	Piñon jay	Eastern fence lizard	Piñon mouse	Ringtail												
Douglas County, Colorado	Golden eagle	Cottontail																						
Sonoran Desert, Arizona	Chuckwalla	Roadrunner	Gila woodpecker	Northern flicker	Tarantula	Gambel's quail	Elf owl	White-winged dove	Common poorwill	Peccary	Phainopepla	Cactus wren	Vermillion flycatcher											

Northern and Rare Birds (also known as Birds of North America)

Species and locations represented in Birds of North America
Avery Island, Louisiana	Carolina parakeet	Ivory-billed woodpecker							
Aransas County, Texas	Whooping crane								
Johnson County, Iowa	Passenger pigeon								
Ventura County, California	California condor								
Cape Prince of Wales, Alaska	Harlequin duck	Steller's eider	Brant	King eider	Spectacled eider	Common eider			
Cape Prince of Wales, Alaska	Willow ptarmigan	Sandhill crane	Snow bunting	Emperor goose	Pacific golden-plover	Yellow wagtail	Tundra swan	Red phalarope	
Bering Strait, Alaska	Black-legged kittiwake	Horned puffin	Common murre	Crested auklet	Pigeon guillemot	Tufted puffin	Least auklet	Parakeet auklet	Pelagic cormorant
Bonaventure Island	Black-legged kittiwake	Gannet	Common murre	Razorbill	Atlantic puffin				

South America (also known as Sketches of South America)

Species and locations represented in Sketches of South America
Brazil	Brocket	White-lipped peccary	Howler monkey	King vulture	Blue-crowned parakeet	Monk parakeet	Red-headed blackbird	Blue-fronted parrot	Capybara	Pampas deer	Scarlet macaw	Toddy flycatcher	Tapir	Swamp deer	Orange-fronted parakeet	Amazon Cassin's parakeet	Scaly-headed parrot
Galápagos	Sally lightfoot crab	Galápagos mockingbird	Galápagos marine iguana	Galápagos tortoise	Galápagos land iguana	Vermilion flycatcher											
Patagonia	Guanaco																
Brazil	Greater rhea	Giant anteater															
Brazil	Maned wolf																

Botswana, Africa (also known as Africa-Botswana: Sharing a Fragile Land and Botswana: Safari to Wild Africa)

Species and locations represented in Botswana: Safari to Wild Africa
Botswana	Chacma baboon	Rufus-crowned roller	Greater kudu	Sable antelope	Warthog	Red-billed francolin	Steenbok	Plains zebra		
Northern Botswana	Lion	Yellow-billed hornbill								
Botswana	Sitatunga	Malachite kingfisher	Nile crocodile	Hippopotamus						
Botswana	Dung beetle	Cheetah	Impala							
Southern Botswana	Gemsbok	Zebra white	African monarch	Brown-veined white	Lemon traveler	Banded gold tip	Broad-bordered grass yellow	African orange tip	Springbok	Red hartebeest
Northern Botswana	African fish eagle	Red lechwe	African monarch	Waterbuck						
Botswana	Bat-eared fox	African civet	African porcupine	Giant eagle owl	Ratel or honey badger	Spring hare	African wildcat			
Botswana	Leopard	Common duiker								
Botswana	Aardwolf	Aardvark	Cape pangolin							

Level 2 Wildlife Halls:

Bears and Sea Mammals (also known as Into the Wild: Bears and Sea Mammals and North America's Bears and Northern Sea Mammals)

Species and locations represented in North America's Bears
Aleutian Islands, Alaska	Brown bear	
Yakutat, Alaska	Glacier bear	
Gribbell Island, British Columbia	Spirit bear	
Alaska	Barren ground grizzly	
Archuleta County, Colorado	Grizzly bear	
Yellowstone National Park, Wyoming	Grizzly bear	Black bear

Species and locations represented in Northern Sea Mammals
Diomede Islands, Bering Strait	Walrus	Bearded seal	Ringed seal	Spotted seal
Pribilof Islands, Alaska	Northern fur seal			
Monterey County, California	California sea lion	Steller sea lion		
Alaska	Polar bear	Ribbon seal		

Edge of the Wild

Species and locations represented in Edge of the Wild
Weld County, Colorado	Pronghorn	Black-tailed prairie dog	Coronis fritillary	Lesser earless lizard	Prairie Rattlesnake	Lark bunting			
Park County, Colorado	Bison	White-tailed jackrabbit							
Clear Creek County, Colorado	Elk (Wapiti)	Lewis' woodpecker	Porcupine	White-breasted nuthatch	Dark-eyed junco	Mountain chickadee			
Yuma County, Colorado	White-tailed deer	Western box turtle	Blue jay	Great horned owl	Bobwhite	Woodhouse's toad			
Eagle County, Colorado	Mule deer	Western tanager	Long-tailed weasel	Steller's jay	American robin	Western toad	Least chipmunk	Phoebus parnassian	Colorado chipmunk
El Paso County, Colorado	Mule deer	Deer mouse	Long-tailed weasel	Steller's jay	Red squirrel	Red-naped sapsucker			
Park County, Colorado	Bighorn sheep	Mexican woodrat	Glover's silk moth (cocoon)						
Mesa County, Colorado	Mountain lion	Gopher snake	Eastern fence lizard	Piñon jay					

North American Wildlife (also known as North America's Wild Places and Scenes of Change)

Species and locations represented in North America's Wild Places
Gates of the Arctic National Park and Preserve, Alaska	Canada lynx			
Yellowstone National Park, Wyoming	American marten	Red squirrel	Golden-mantled ground squirrel	Clark's nutcracker
Kenai Fjords National Park, Alaska	Mountain goat	Gyrfalcon, largest of the falcons		
Gates of the Arctic National Park and Preserve, Alaska	Gray wolf			
Denali National Park, Alaska	Dall's sheep			
Ellesmere Island	Muskox	Gray wolves (white variety called "Arctic")		
Cassiar Mountains, British Columbia	Stone's sheep	Hoary marmot		
Prudhoe Bay, Alaska	Caribou	Willow ptarmigan in winter-white plumage		
San Miguel County, Colorado	American mink	Steller's jays		
Denali National Park, Alaska	Wolverine			

Species and locations represented in Scenes of Change
Jackson County, Colorado	Beaver								
Elbert County, Colorado	Coyote	Darkling beetle	Edwards' fritillary	Orange sulphur					
Talkeetna Mountains, Alaska	Caribou	Arctic ground squirrel	Moose						
Montague Island, Alaska	Sitka deer	American crow	Steller's jay						
Porter's Creek, Great Smoky Mountains National Park, North Carolina and Tennessee	Black-and-white warbler	Scarlet tanager	Eastern chipmunk	Ovenbird	Black-throated blue warbler	Dark-eyed junco	Red squirrel	Striped skunk	White-eyed vireo
Great Smoky Mountains National Park, North Carolina and Tennessee	Southern flying squirrel	Whip-poor-will	Hairy-tailed mole	Raccoon	Eastern screech-owl				
Hoh River, Olympic National Park, Washington	Douglas squirrel	Pacific banana slug	Yellow-spotted millipede	Lorquin's admiral					
Orient Mine, San Luis Valley, Colorado	Mexican free-tailed bat								
Citrus County, Florida	West Indian manatee	Pinfish	Striped mullet	Bluegill					

Australia and South Pacific Islands (also known as Australia and South Pacific)

Species and locations represented in Australia
Australia	Australian king parrot	Short-nosed echidna	Superb lyrebird	Crimson rosella	Brush bronzewing	Laughing kookaburra		
Australia	Gould's sand goanna	Emu	Frilled lizard	Galah	Crested pigeon	Red-tailed cockatoo	Budgerigar	A mob of red kangaroos
Australia	Koala							
Australia	Lumholtz's tree kangaroo							
Barron Falls, Northern Queensland, Australia	Paradise riflebird	Little red flying fox	Spectacled flying fox	Gouldian finch	Double-wattled cassowary	Scrub python	Brush turkeys	Rainbow lory

Species and locations represented in South Pacific
Sub-Antarctic Campbell Island, New Zealand	Royal albatross																		
Sub-Antarctic Campbell Island, New Zealand	New Zealand fur seal	Rockhopper penguin	Erect-crested penguin	Yellow-eyed penguins	Silver gull	Southern giant petrel	Southern elephant seal	Brown skua											
Laysan Island, Hawaii	White tern	Common noddy	Sooty tern	Brown booby	Pacific golden plover	Laysan albatross	Ruddy turnstone	Bristle-thighed curlew	Black-bellied plover	Laysan finch	Laysan honeycreeper	Laysan duck	Laysan millerbird	Red-tailed tropicbird	Wedge-tailed shearwater	Black-footed albatross	Laysan rail	Masked booby	Great frigate bird

Out of all of the dioramas in the museum listed here, only one, Western Brazil, which depicted wildlife on the Brazilian savanna, was removed for not being scientifically accurate, because it included animals that didn't naturally interact with each other in the wild. However, at least three pieces of evidence that prove that the diorama did exist can be found in the museum: one being a cropped image of the screenshot of the diorama's brocket deer from the museum's 1961 annual report in Edge of the Wild, and the other two being the scarlet macaw and blue-fronted parrot found in the glass case at South America's entry wall.

Insects & Butterflies

Insects & Butterflies is a wildlife exhibit on the first floor that's separated into four displays: Pinning Down Insects, which classifies the different groups of arthropods and features the twelve common orders of insects; Deceits & Defenses, which shows different insects that have their own ways of defending themselves, as well as including a miniature diorama depicting a foothills shrubland with many hidden insects; Colorado Lepidoptera, which features 171 species of butterflies and moths found in Colorado including the Colorado hairstreak, Colorado's state insect; and Form Follows Function, which shows the life cycle of a mourning cloak butterfly, a small collection of rainforest butterflies, and two species of Morpho butterflies next to a model of scales from one of the wings of a blue morpho.

Egyptian Mummies

Located on the second floor, Egyptian Mummies contains two mummies, along with several coffins and other various antiquities from ancient Egypt. In both 1991 and 2016, the mummies were subjected to CT scans at Children's Hospital in Aurora, Colorado. Also on display is a miniature temple, based on one from the time of King Ramses II.

Coors Gems & Minerals

Coors Gems & Minerals is a hall located on the first floor where visitors can examine many colorful crystals and minerals found both locally and globally. It features a re-created mine based on the Sweet Home mine, where the Alma King, the largest specimen of rhodochrosite exhibited near the entrance, was originally found on August 21, 1992. It is also home to the museum's oldest exhibit: crystallized leaf gold, which was donated in 1900, the same year the museum was founded. Starting April 15 2026, Coors Gems & Minerals underwent renovation which will increase the floorplan by 50%. The expected date of completion is in 2027.

Discovery Zone Located on the second floor of the building towards the back of the building, the Discovery Zone offers a play area for younger museum visitors aged 0-8 years. A paleontology zone in the bottom right corner allows visitors to uncover "fossils" using rudimentary paleontology tools such as the basic brushes provided. Visitors can climb on a statue of a Parasaurolophus right past the paleontology area. One prominent fixture is the water way in the middle of the exhibition where visitors can play with water.

Konovalenko Gem Carvings

The museum features the only public collection of gem carvings by the Ukrainian-born Soviet artist Vasily Konovalenko outside of Moscow, located on the third floor within the South American Wildlife Hall.

Crane Hall of North American Indian Cultures

The Crane Hall of North American Indian Cultures is currently closed for renovations

Ancient Denver

Ancient Denver, a series of paintings by local artists that depict the Denver area from 300 million years ago to the present.

In addition to the exhibit halls, skeletons of Tyrannosaurus rex, a pair of Thalassomedon and a fin whale, as well as a replica of the Chief Kyan totem pole, can be found in the rotunda. A display that shows how escalators work is also found at one of the two up escalators on the first floor.

== Research and collections ==
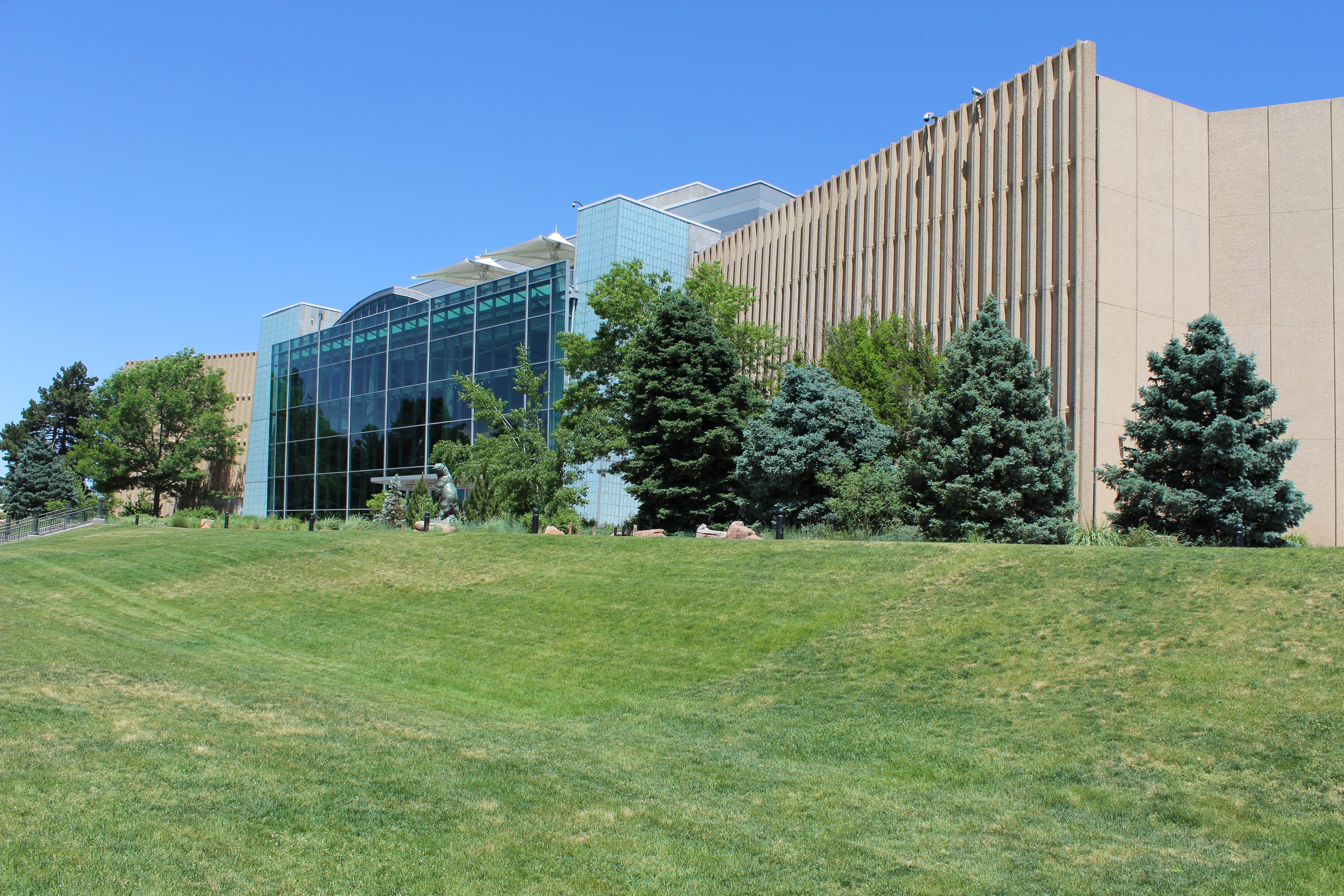
West facade

- The Anthropology Collection contains over 50,000 objects and is made up of archaeological and ethnological artifacts from North America. The department also curates collections from Central and South America, Africa, Asia, and Oceania. Additional holdings include the 800-piece Ethnological Art Collection, and archival photographs and documents. The department is fully committed to compliance with the 1990 Native American Graves Protection and Repatriation Act (NAGPRA) and all other national and international laws that impact anthropological objects.
- Earth Sciences Collection consists of six main groups: vertebrate paleontology, paleobotany, invertebrate paleontology, minerals, meteorites, and micromount.
- Health Sciences Collection is composed of rare and unique human anatomy specimens, as well as a small selection of pieces of medical importance.
- Space Sciences Lab is responsible for the museum's Scientific Instruments Collection. This collection is composed of instruments that have been used by museum staff members or are excellent type-examples of particular instruments. In addition, the Department of Space Sciences maintains a large digital collection of images and multimedia assets (presentations, video, visualizations) of use in research, public programs, and Space Odyssey.
- Zoology Collection houses over 900,000 specimens or specimen lots (groups of specimens) including over 40,000 vials of arachnids (spiders and their relatives), over 780,000 insects, especially the orders Coleoptera (the beetles) and Lepidoptera (the butterflies and moths), 17,000 shell lots representing shells from all over the world, approximately 52,000 bird specimens, including a significant nest and egg collection, over 14,000 specimens of mammals, including several threatened or endangered species and several species now considered extinct. The small botany collection includes over 2,500 specimens representing 130 families. Specimens records are published, via Arctos and Symbiota, to data portals such as SCAN, ORNIS, MANIS, VertNet, GBIF, GenBank, and BISON.
- Bailey Library and Archives focuses on anthropology, earth sciences, health sciences, space sciences, zoology, the Rocky Mountain West, and museum studies. It contains over 53,000 publications, 2,500 rare books, and 9,000 volumes of scientific periodicals.

== Selection of temporary exhibits ==
The museum features temporary exhibits from other museums. Temporary exhibits tend to be at the museum for a period of around six months. Exhibitions the museum have featured in that past include

- Maya: Hidden Worlds Revealed, a large exhibit covering art, culture, astronomy, religion, ball games and warfare, as well as potential reasons for the collapse of the Mayan empire.
- Whales: Giants of the Deep, an exhibit that originated in New Zealand, where there was a large whale-fishing industry. The exhibit includes whale skulls and skeletons, videos, cultural artifacts, and "exploration stations".
- Traveling the Silk Road, artifacts from the ancient trade route, from Xi’an, the imperial city of China's Tang Dynasty, to Istanbul.

== Gates Planetarium ==
Gates Planetarium is a 125-seat planetarium that features unidirectional, semi-reclining stadium seating, 16.4 surround-sound system featuring Ambisonic, a 3-D spatial sound system, and a perforated metal dome, 56 ft (17 m) in diameter and tilted 25 degrees. The current planetarium replaces an older, dome-style planetarium.

== Infinity Theater ==
The Infinity Theater on the second floor of the museum was built as the Phipps Auditorium in 1940, and was used for lectures, concerts, and films until 1980. Renovated and reopened in 1983 as the Phipps IMAX Theater, it seats 440 people and now shows large-format films daily.

In July 2022, the Phipps IMAX Theater was closed for renovations for sound, visual, and lobby. The theater is now open as of February 2023 and gave it the new name of "Infinity Theater". It is now capable of showing media in 2D or 3D via laser projection.

== Morgridge Family Exploration Center and Avenir Collections Facility ==
In 2014, a $70 million addition was added to the museum containing the Morgridge Family Exploration Center and the Avenir Collections Center.

The Morgridge Family Exploration Center constitutes three above-ground levels that encourage visitors to learn about science and the natural world. The center includes Exploration Studios, a new temporary exhibition gallery, an atrium space, a completely redeveloped Discovery Zone for early learners, and the outdoor, Boettcher Plaza with unique public art.

The Avenir Collections Center, part of a $70 million expansion in 2007, is a climate-controlled facility devoted to housing for nearly 1.5 million artifacts and specimens. The facility includes 63,000 square feet (5,900 m^{2}) in two underground levels, and holds specimens such as bison from the 1870s, passenger pigeons, the last grizzly bear to be killed in Colorado in 1979, and roadkill brought in by the public. The data from these specimens is placed in online databases, and linked to public databases, like BioPortal.

== Museum secrets ==
The museum contains a number of hidden secrets that visitors may search for. On the Denver Museum website, there are four different downloadable scavenger hunts available, ranging from State Parks to "Museum Treasures". Kent Pendleton, one of the museum's diorama painters, painted eight elves in his work, hidden throughout the museum. Guests are encouraged to search for the elves with one of the printable scavenger hunts.

== Gallery ==
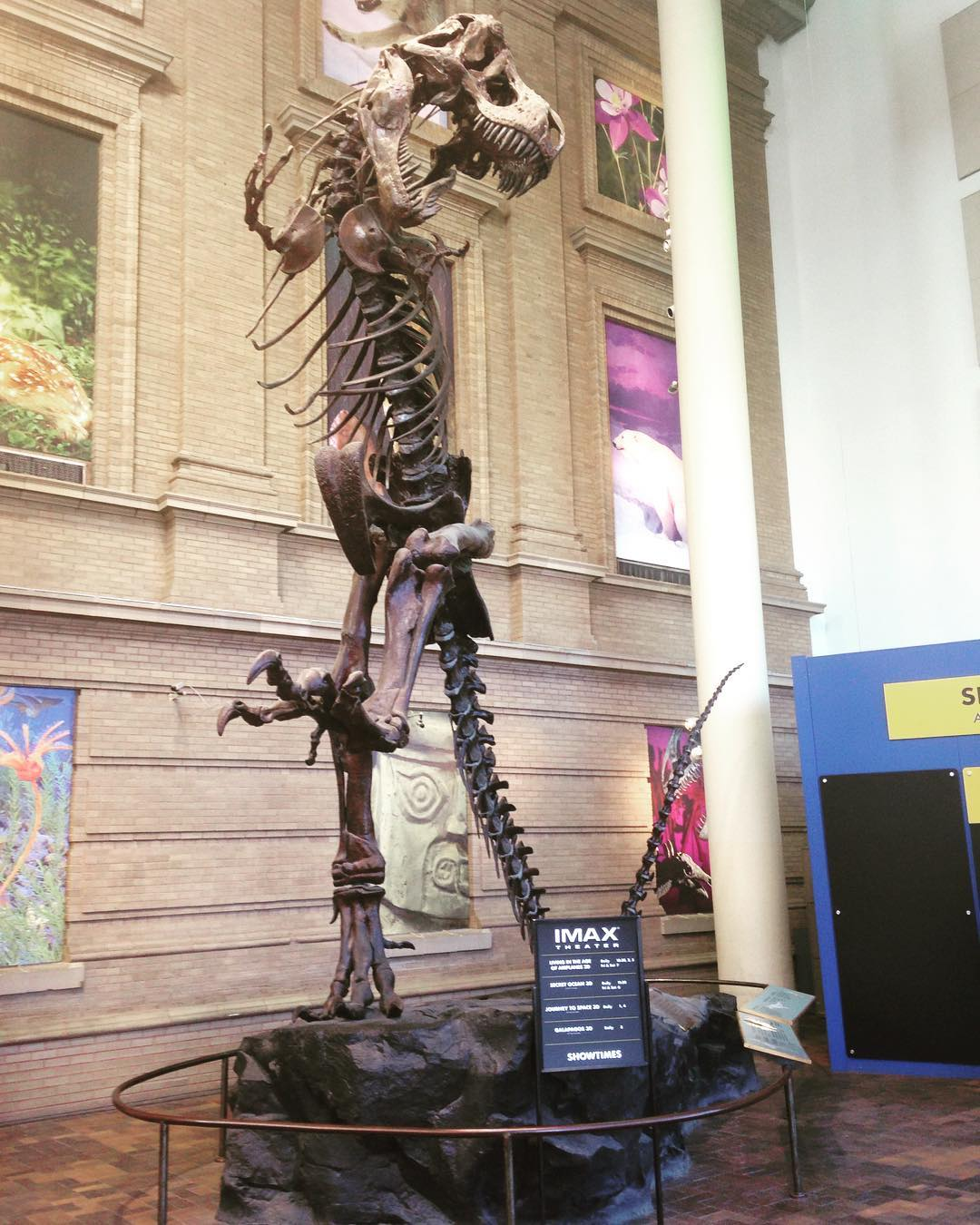
Tyrannosaurus rex skeleton located at the museum entrance

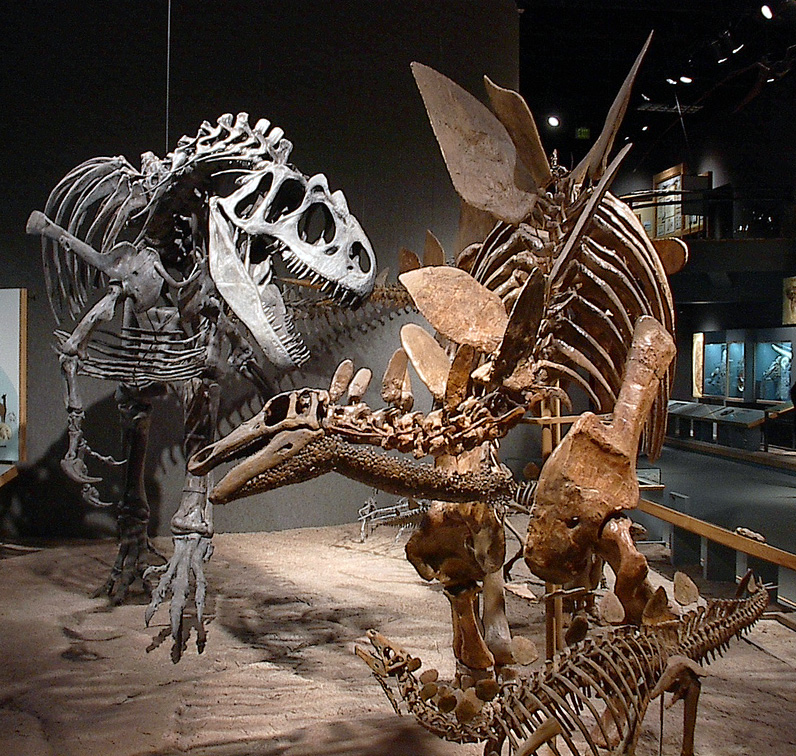
A Stegosaurus stenops and an Allosaurus fragilis from the Prehistoric Journey exhibit

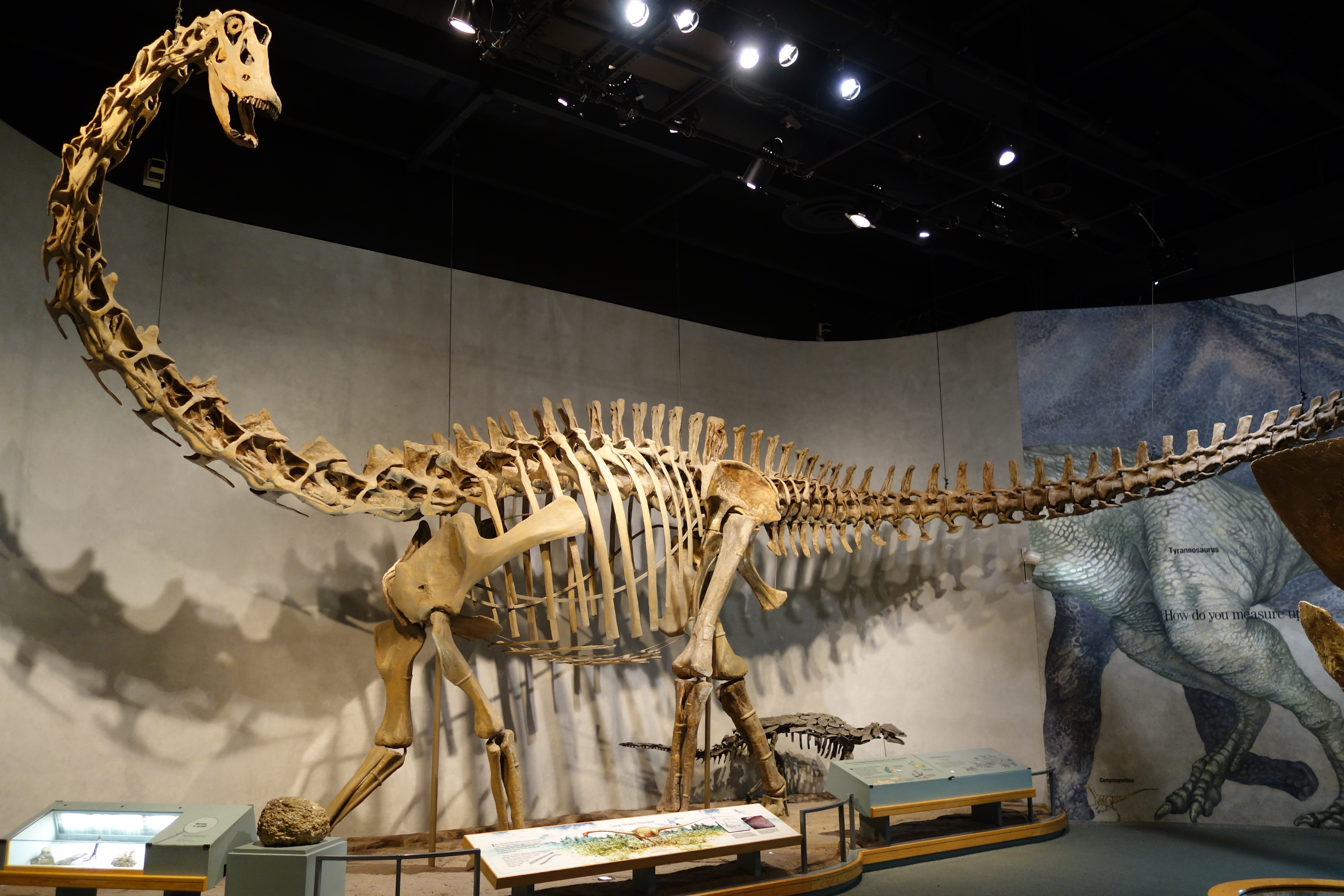
A Diplodocus longus

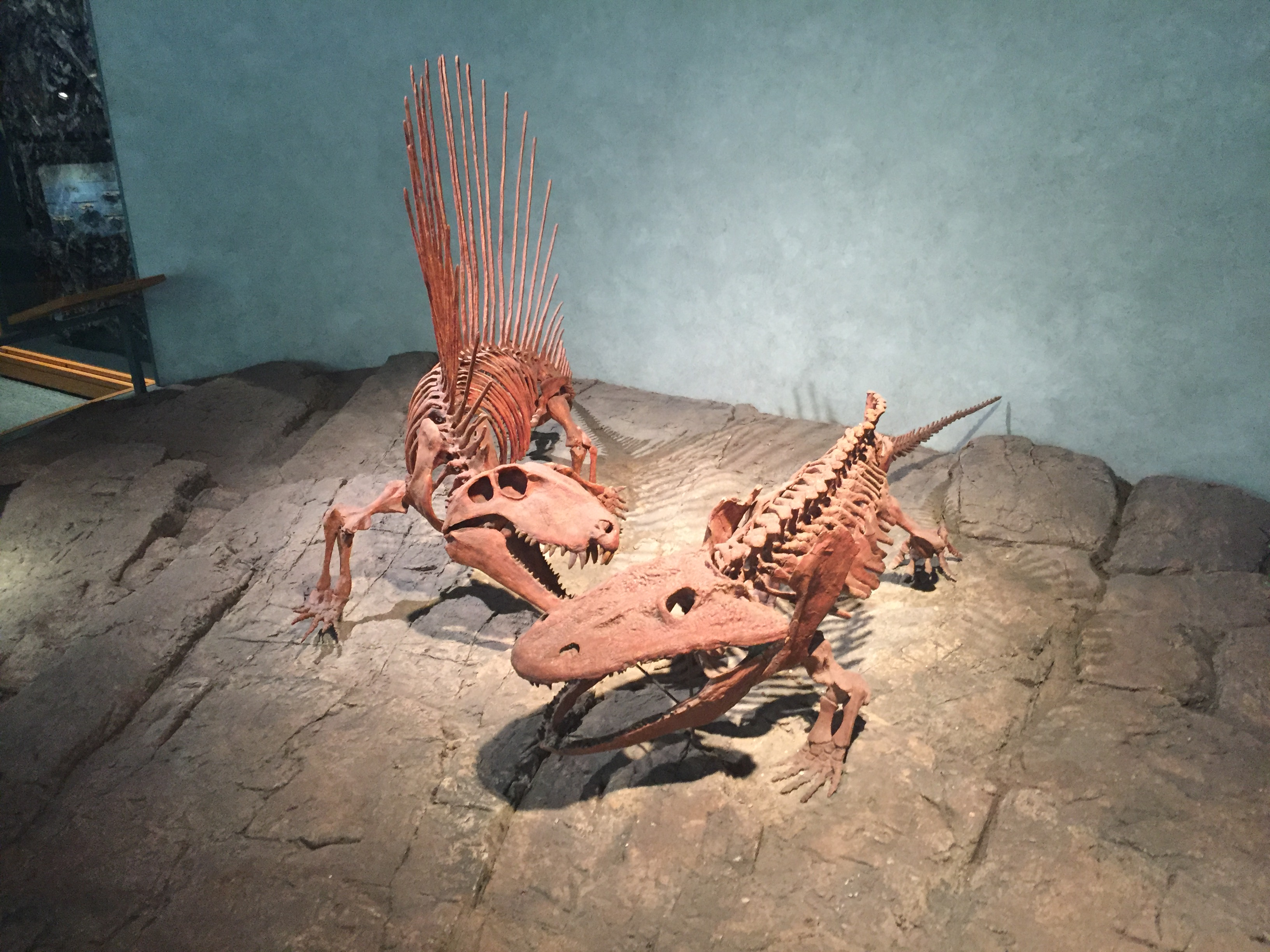
A Dimetrodon limbatus and an Eryops megacephalus

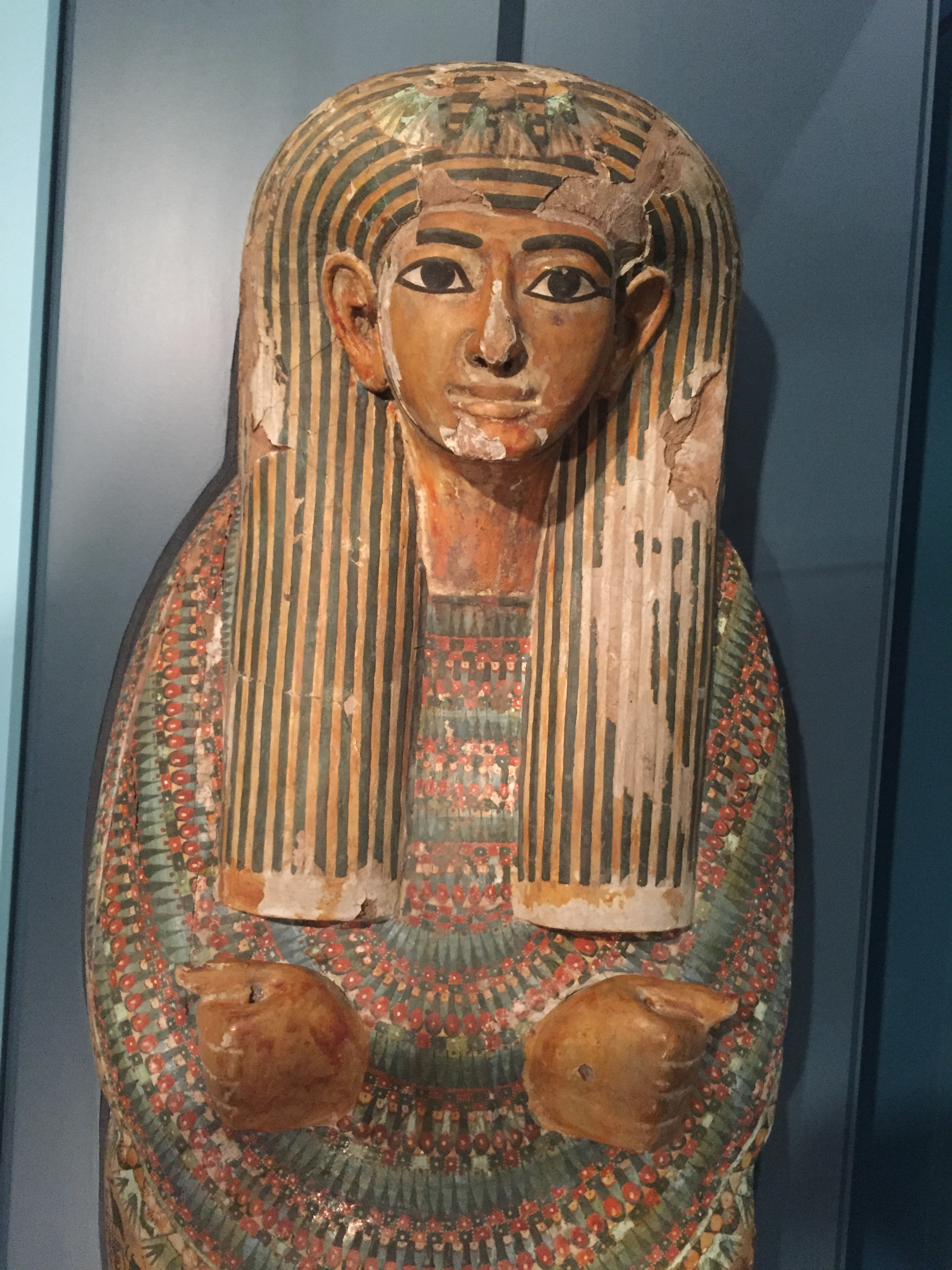
Coffin lid of Ankh-ef-en-Khonsu, a scribe at the Temple of Amun in Thebes

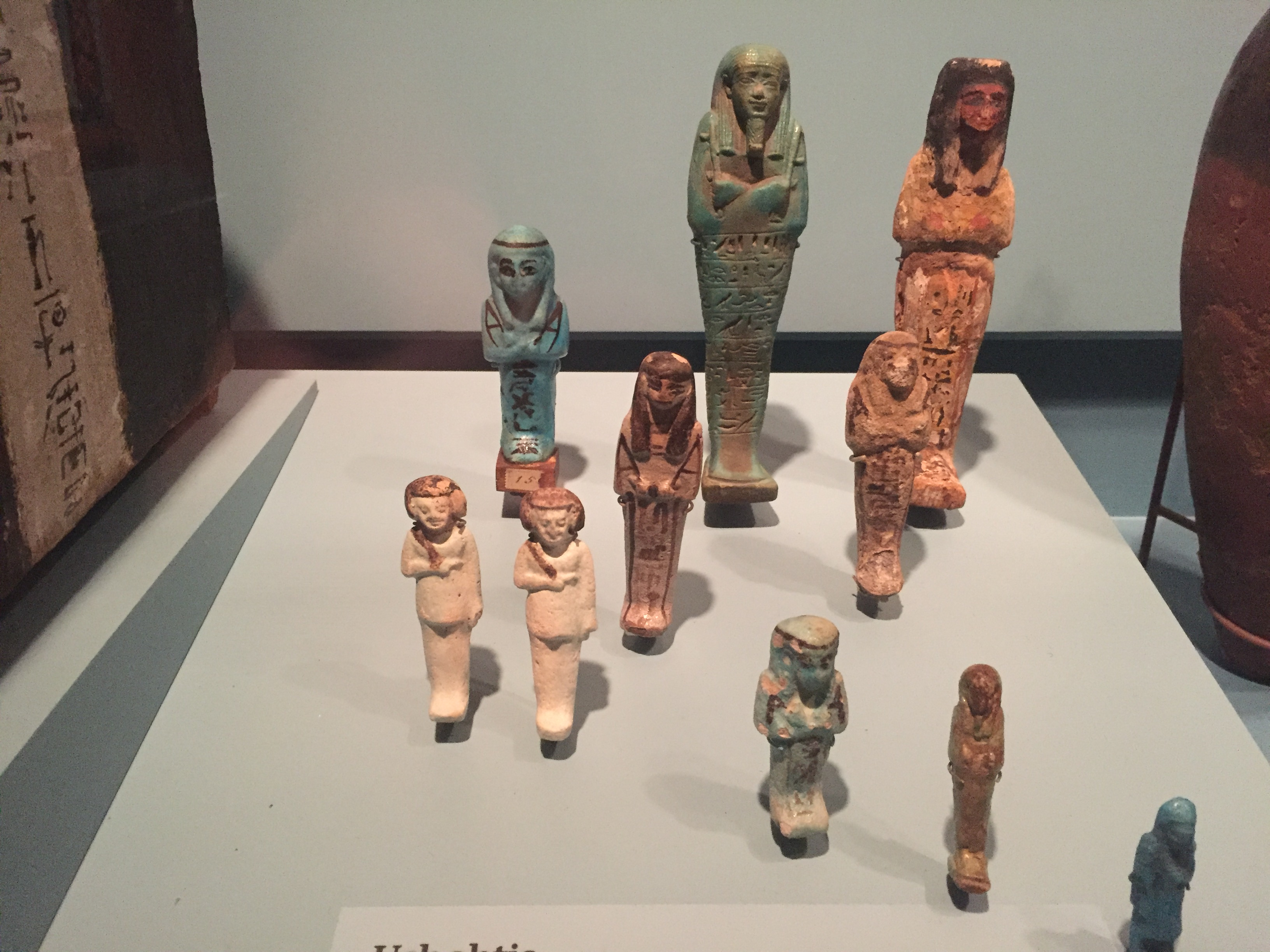
An assortment of Ushabti figurines

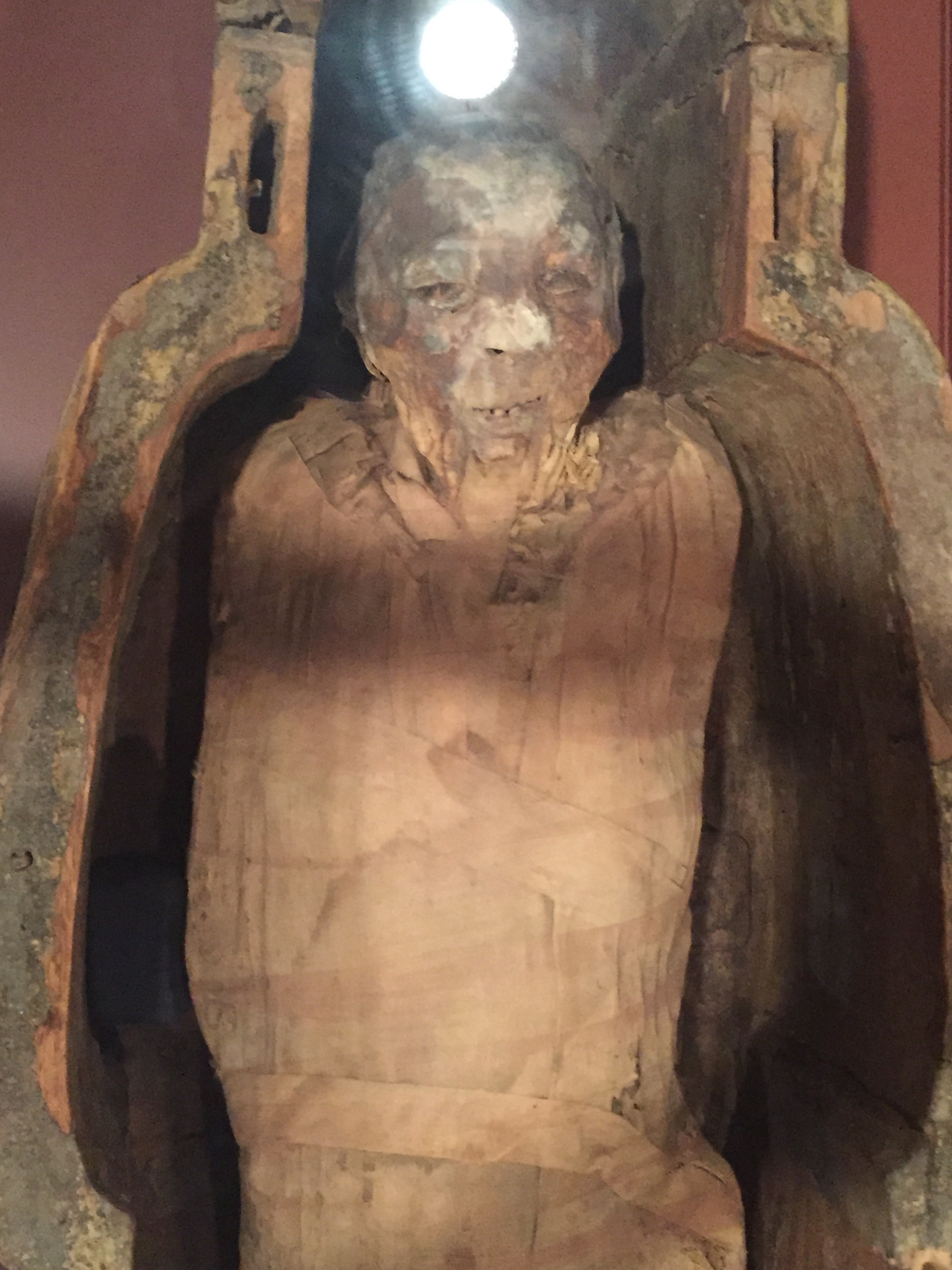
The so-called "Poor Woman's Mummy", from the Ptolomeic period.

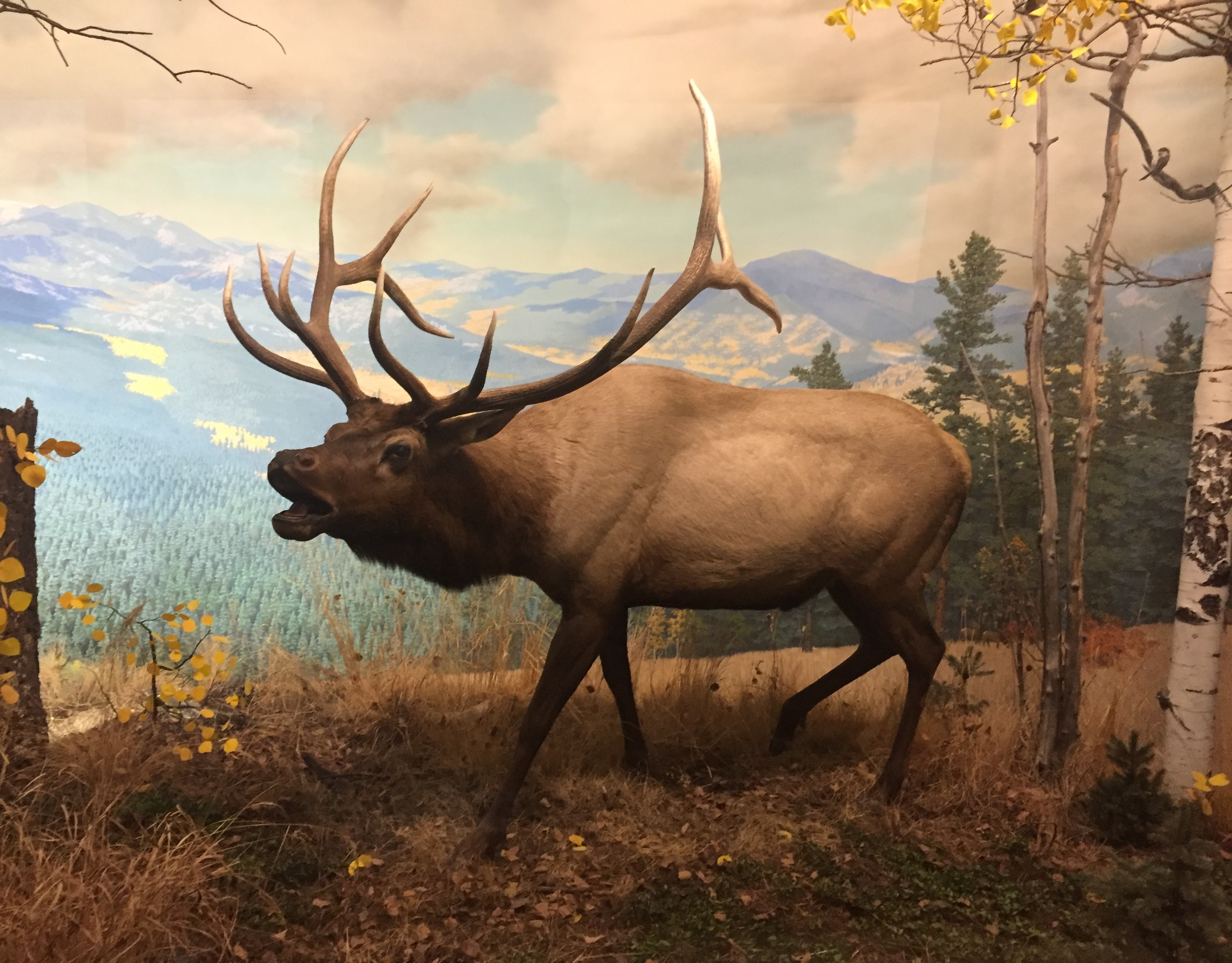
Wapiti Elk from a diorama

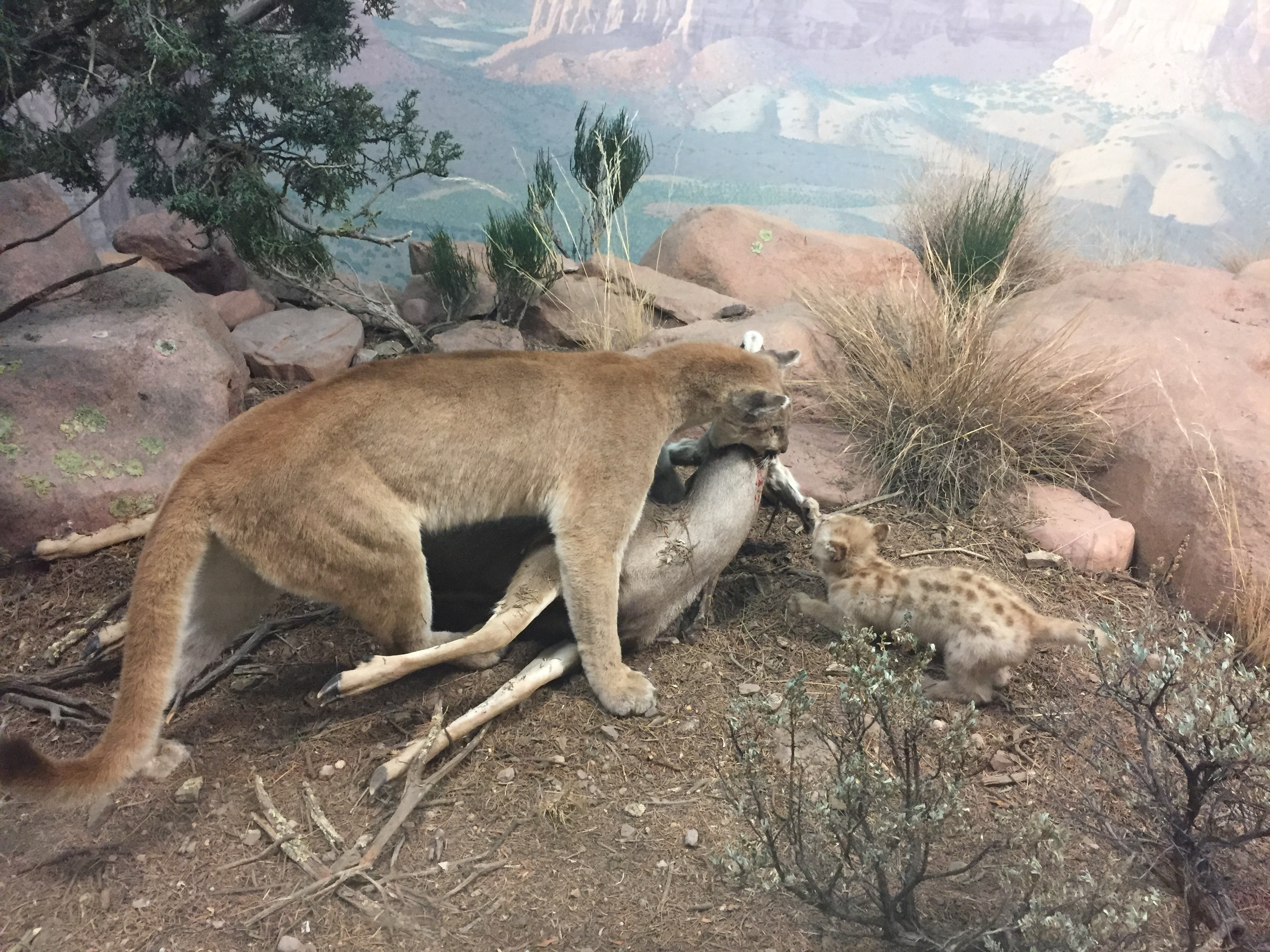
Mountain Lion diorama

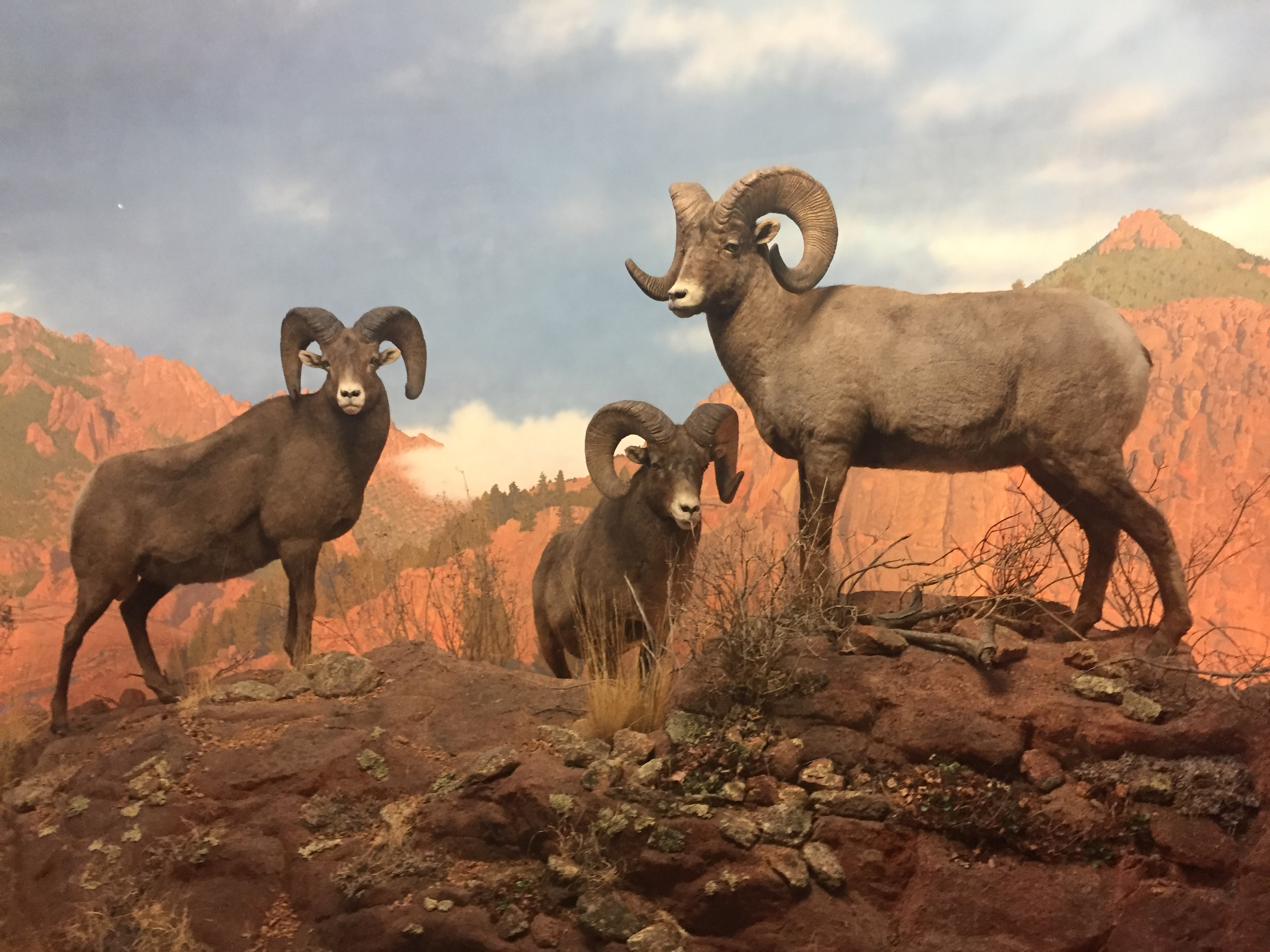
Bighorn sheep diorama

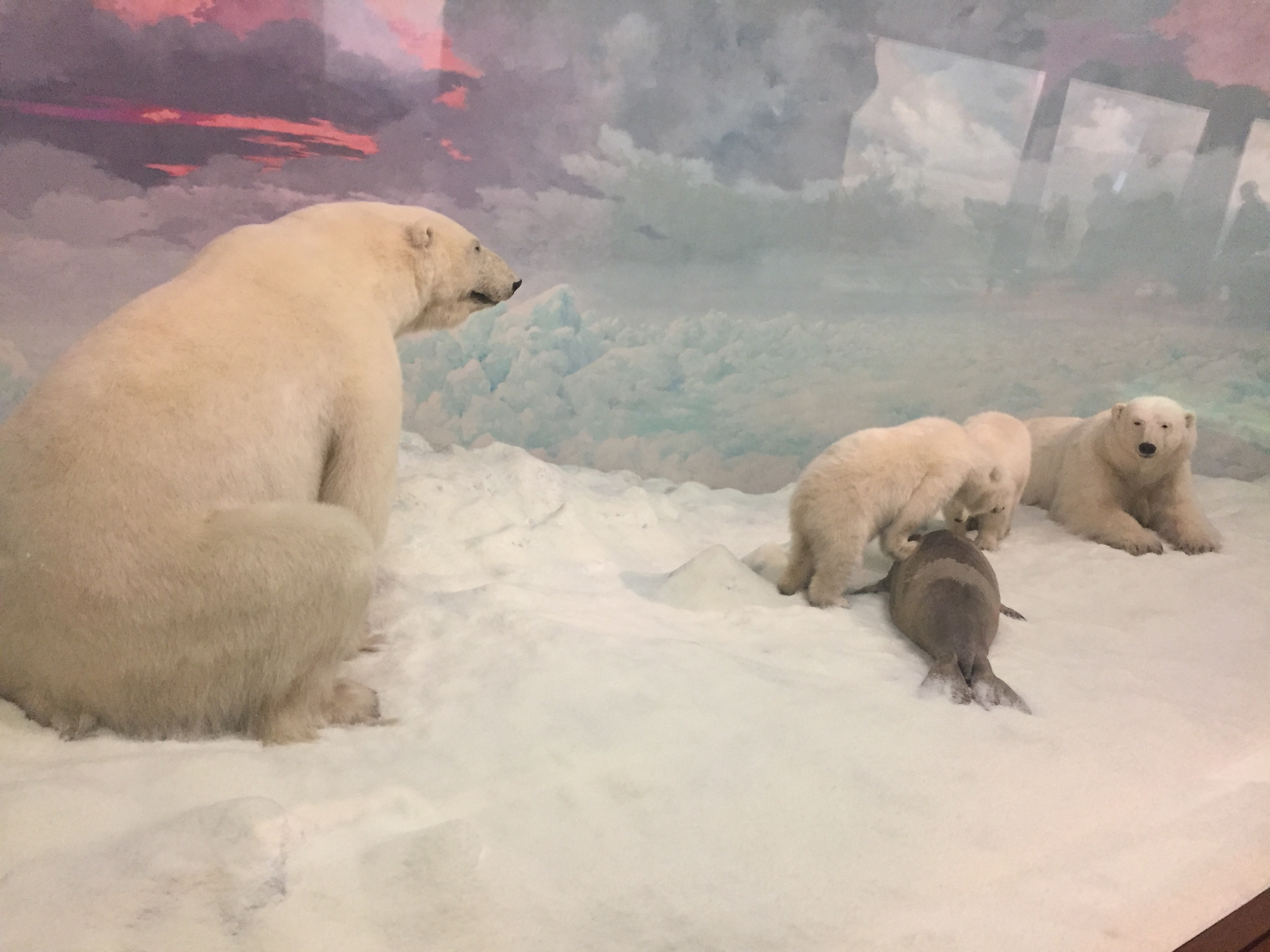
The Museum's famous 1942 Polar bear diorama, featuring a ringed seal

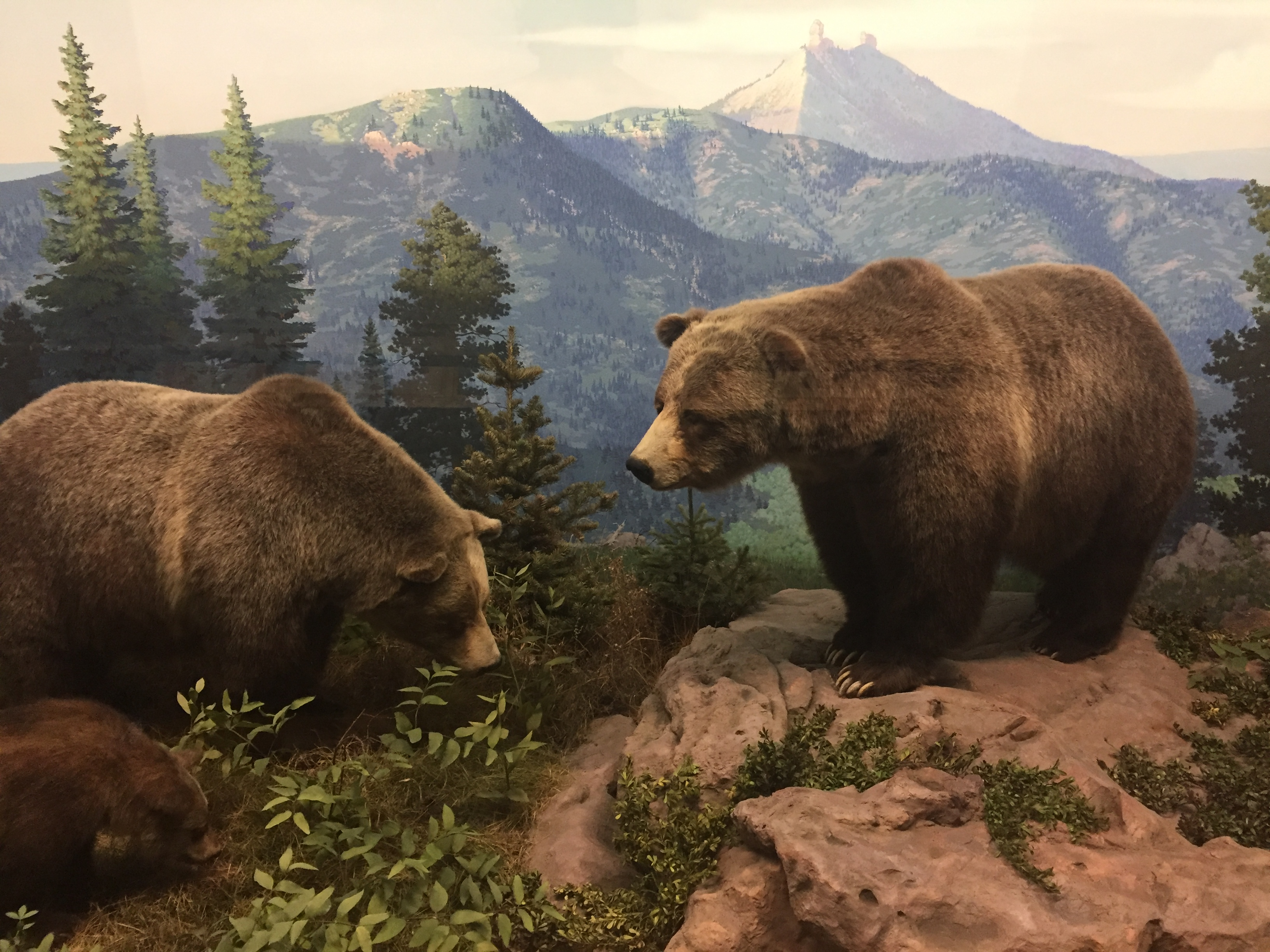
Diorama featuring Grizzly bears at Chimney Rock; Grizzlies have not been extant in Colorado since 1979

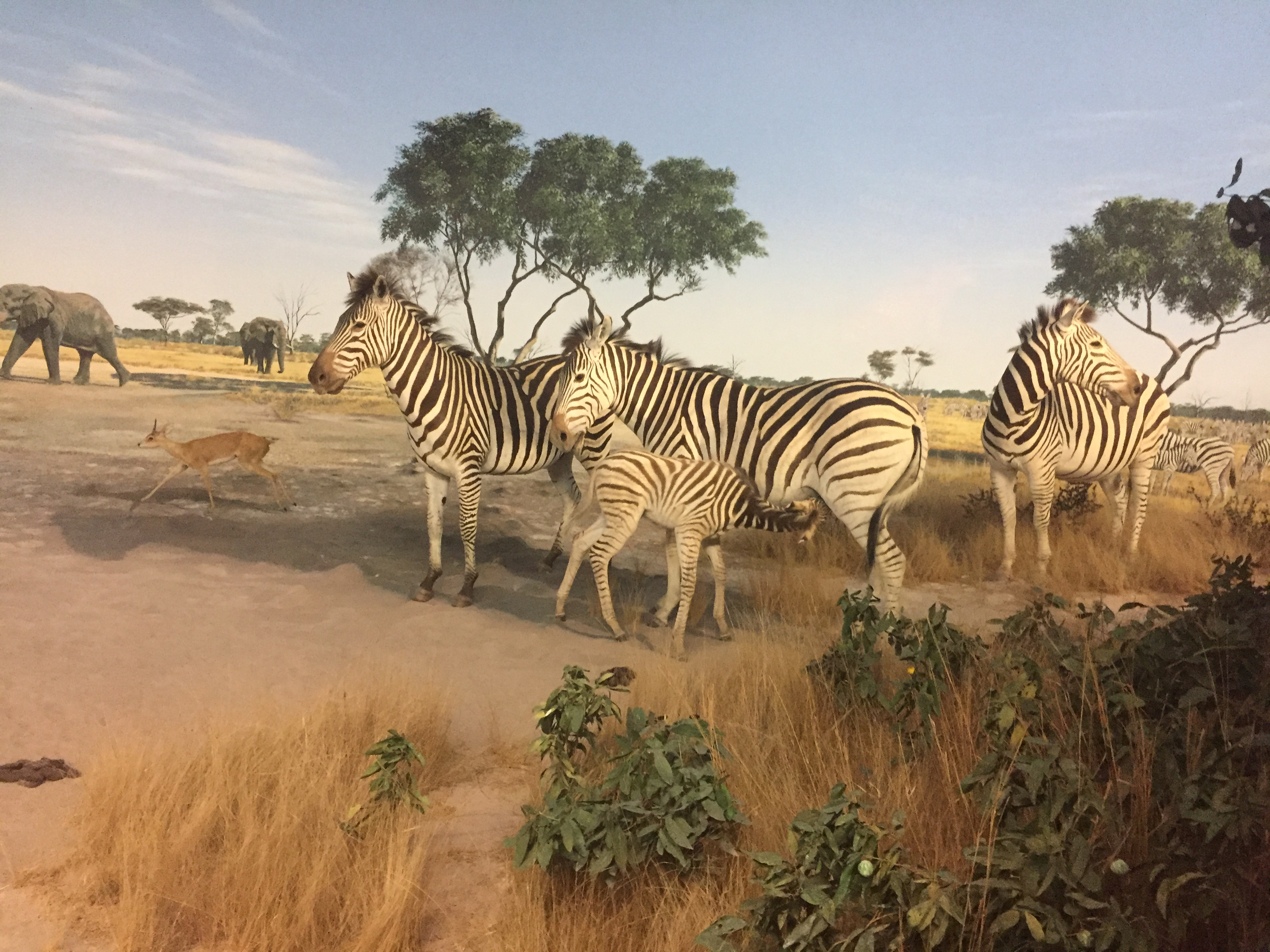
Plains Zebras and a Steenbok in a diorama from the 'Botswana' exhibit

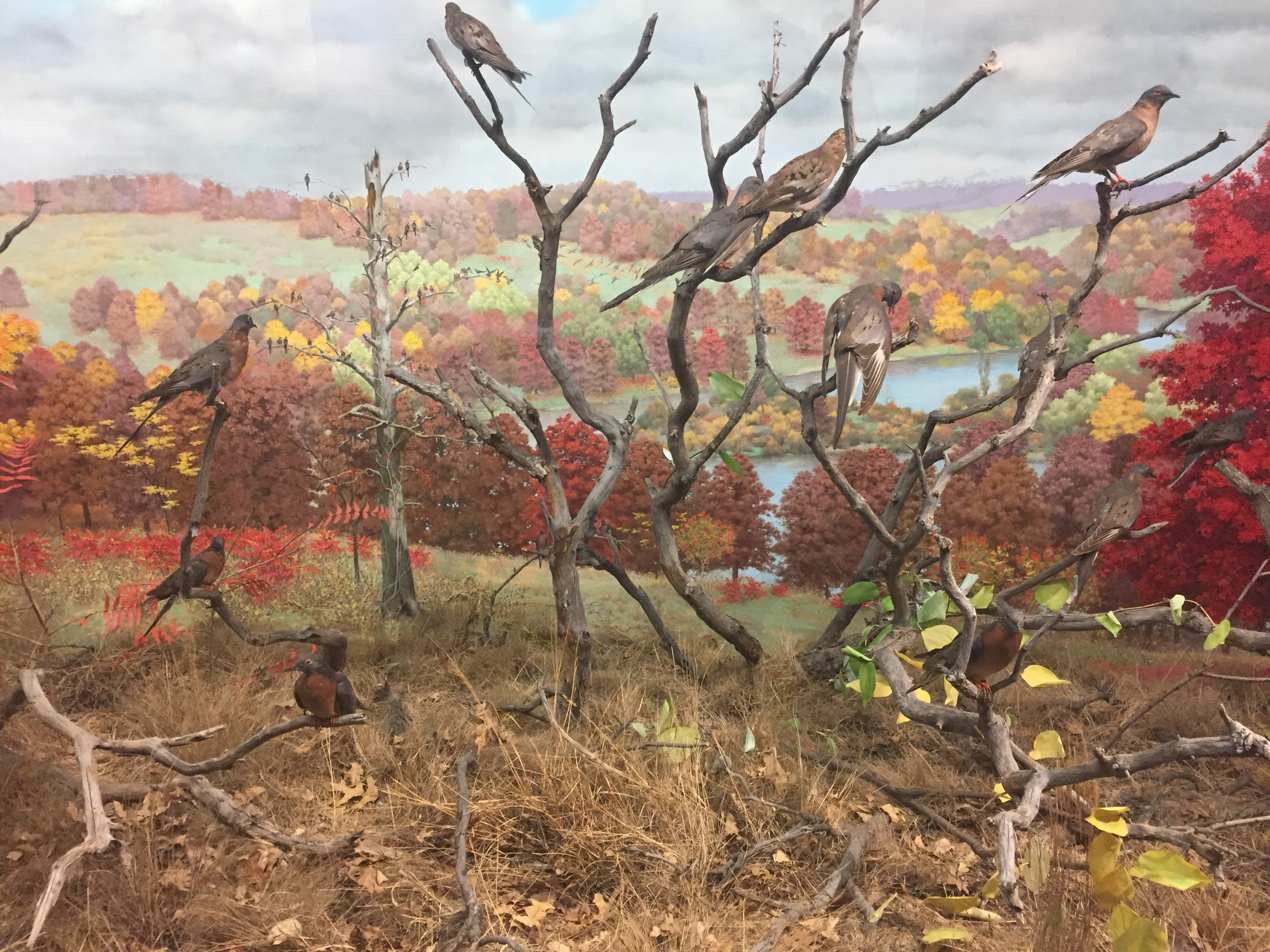
Passenger Pigeons from Johnson County, Iowa in this 1890s scene in a diorama featuring the now extinct bird

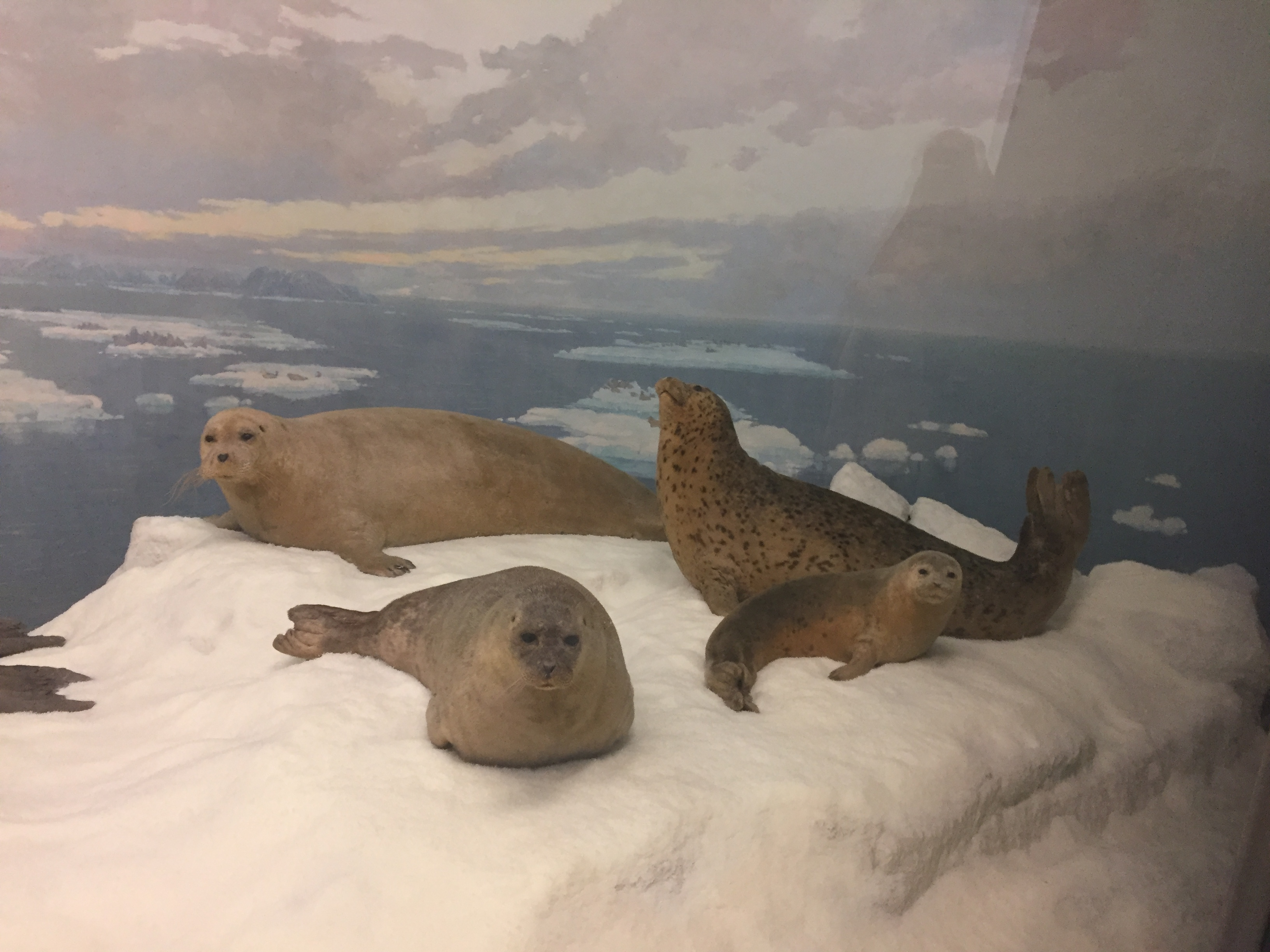
A Bearded seal, a Ringed seal, and two Spotted seals from a portion of a diorama from the Bering Strait near the Diomede Islands

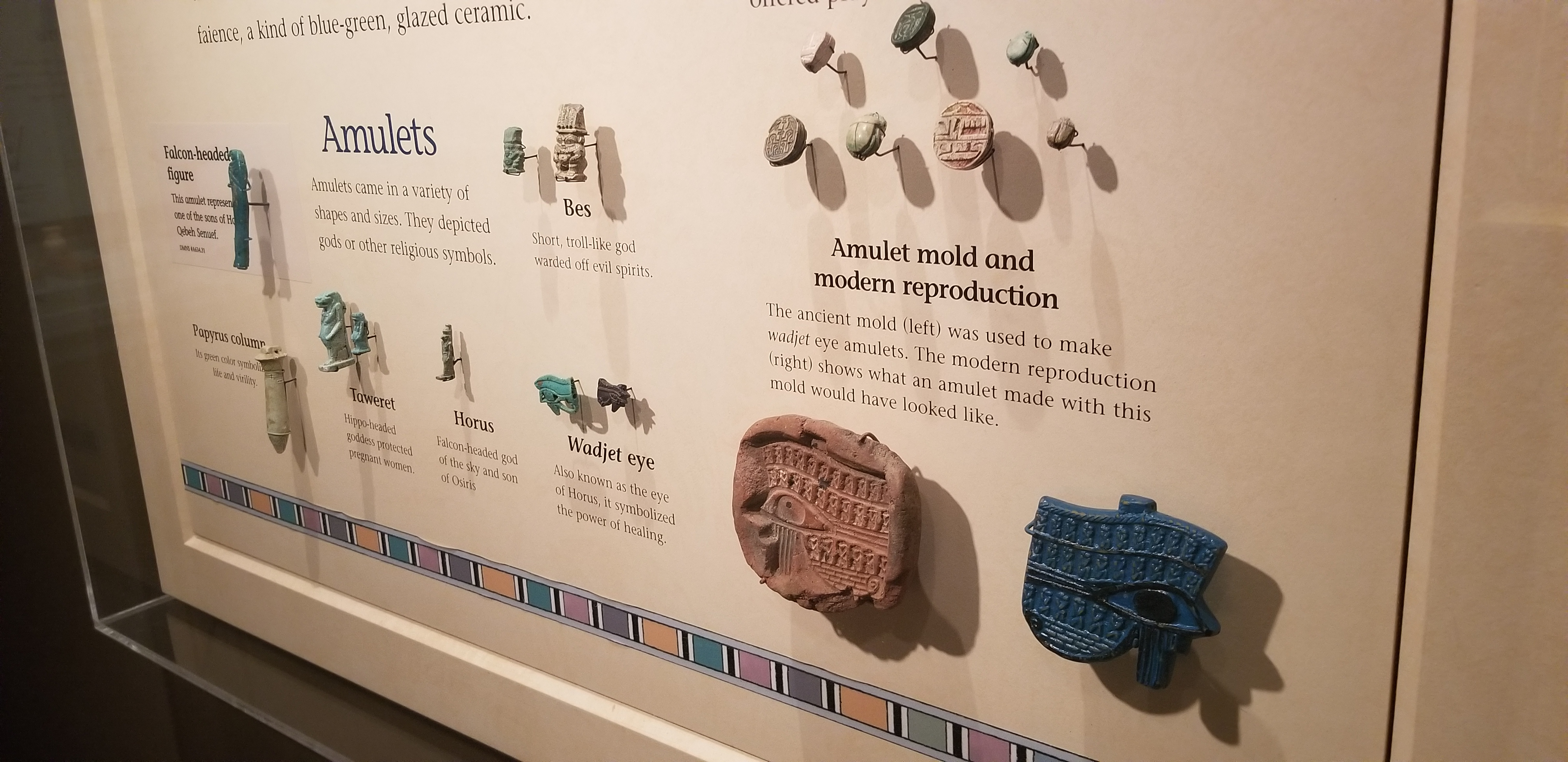
Amulets at the Denver Museum of Nature and Science

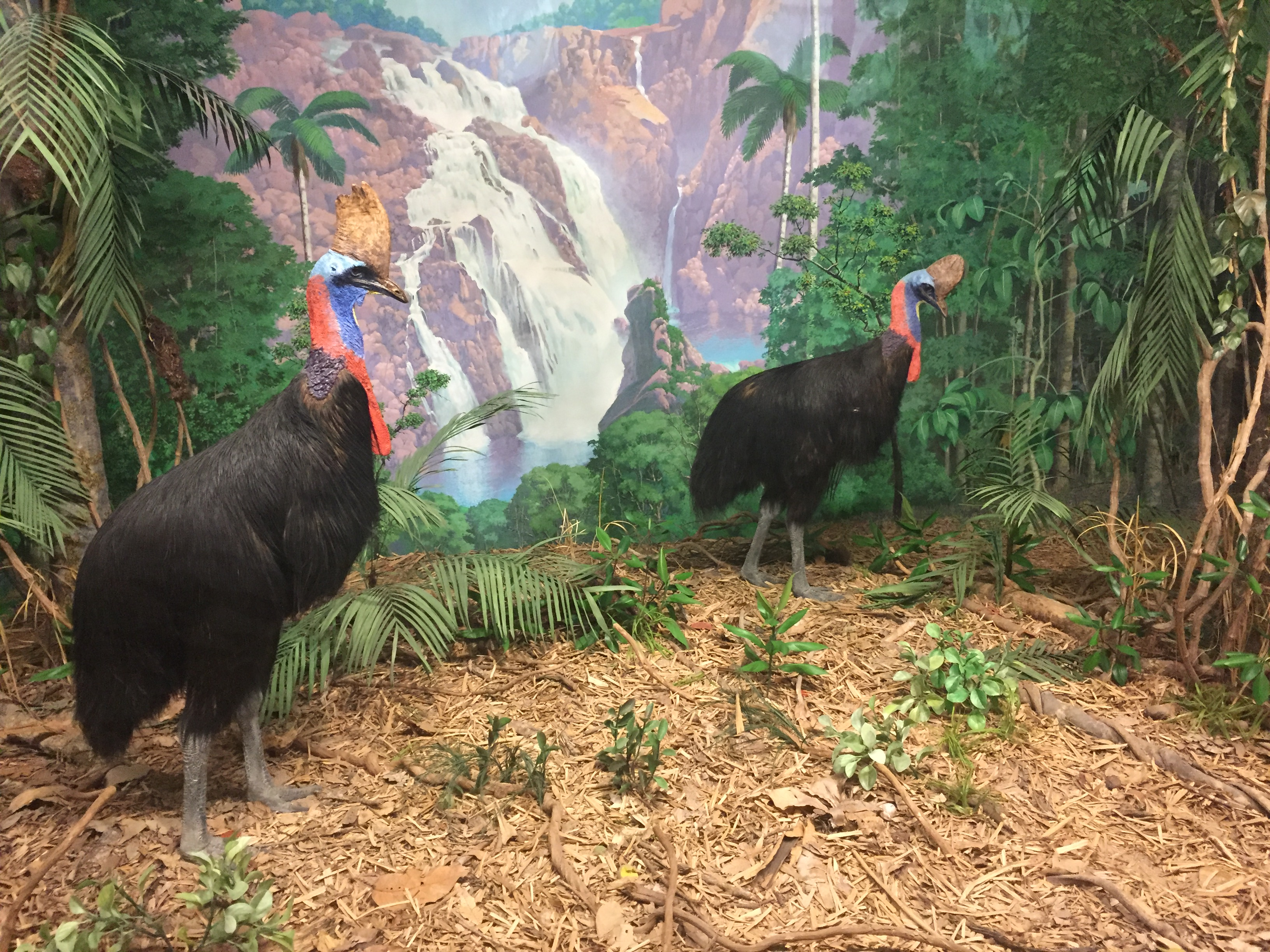
A diorama featuring two southern cassowaries

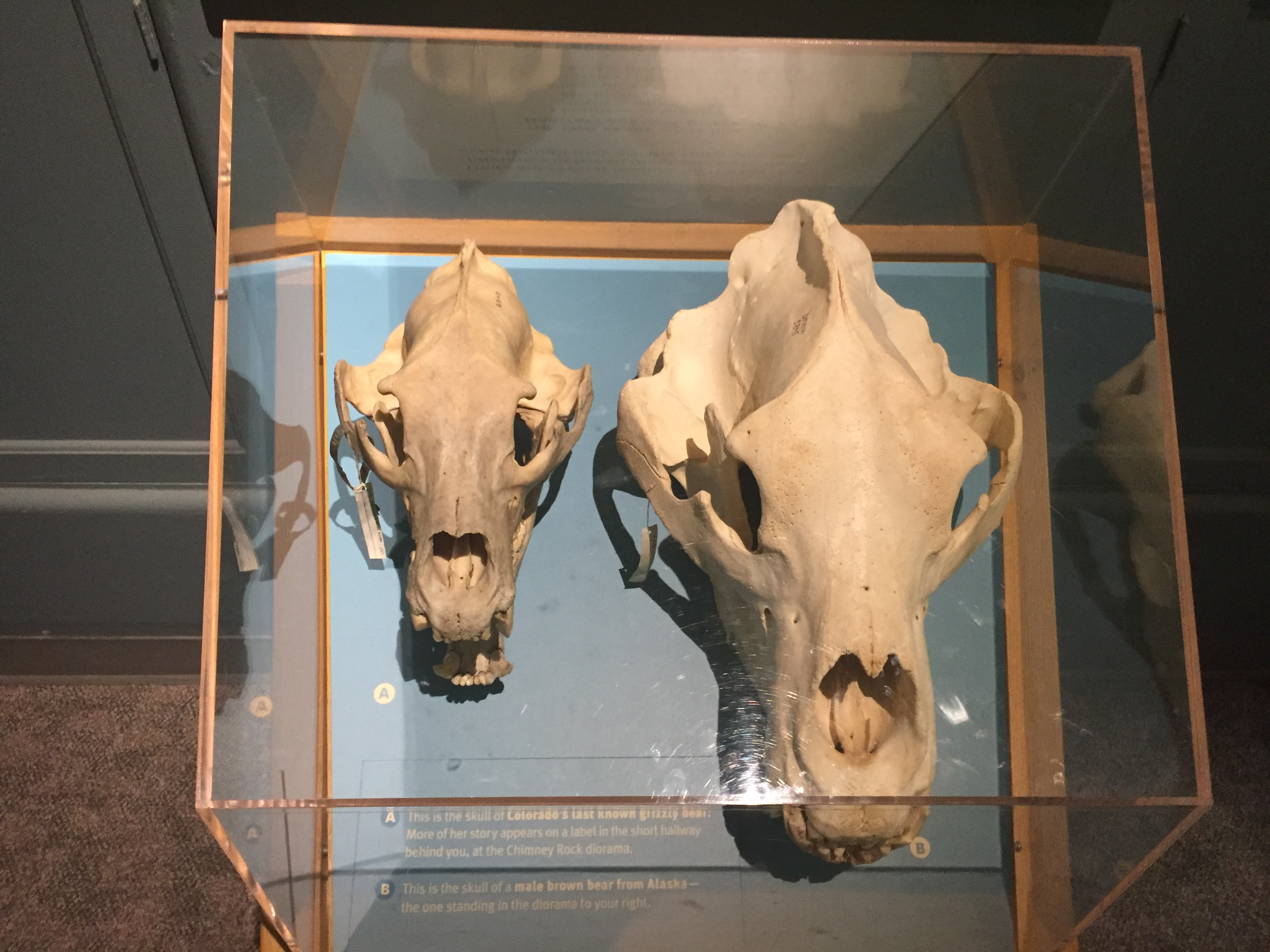
Comparison of skulls from a normal Grizzly bear and its Alaska subspecies

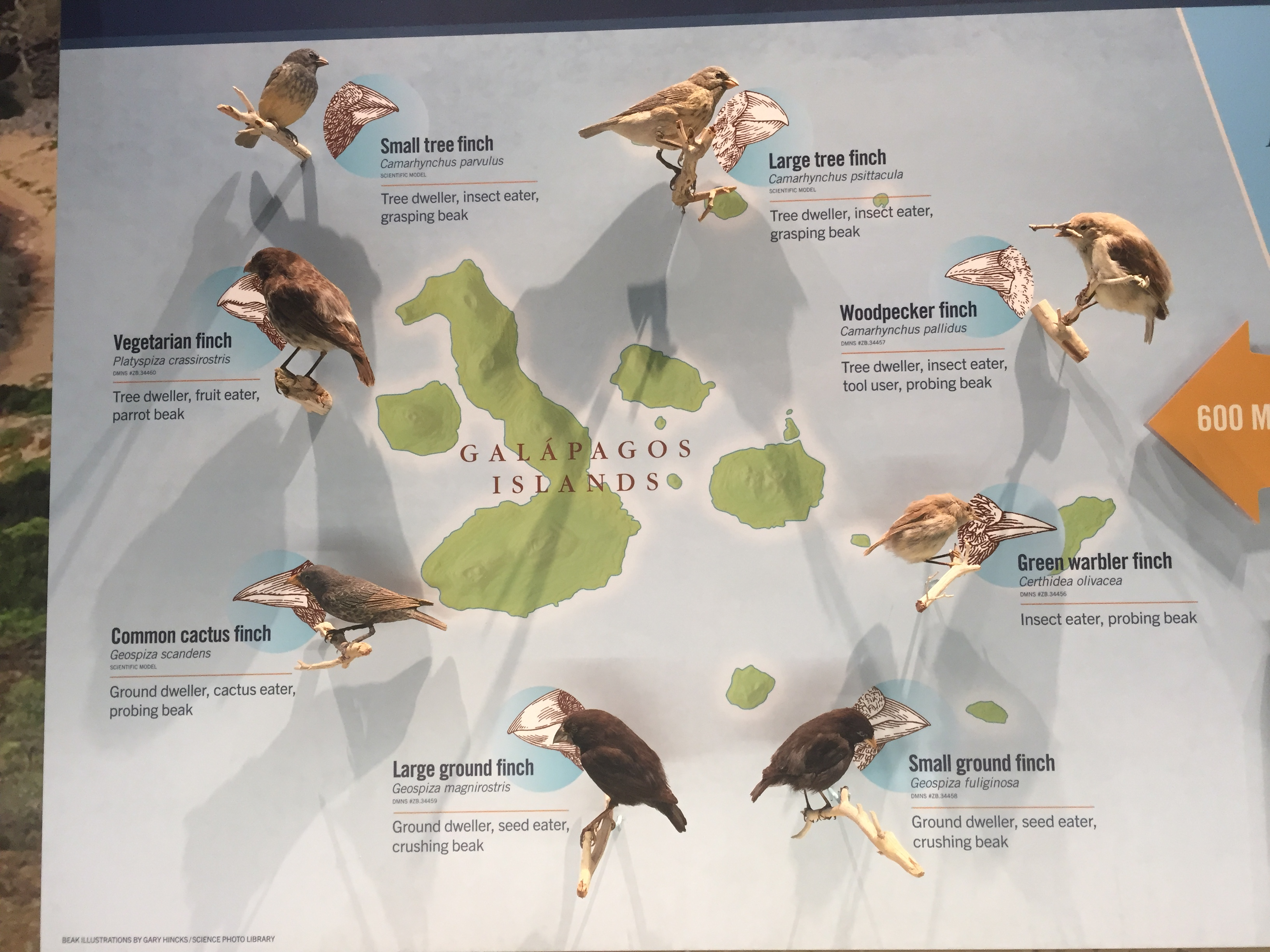
Display of assorted Darwin's finches

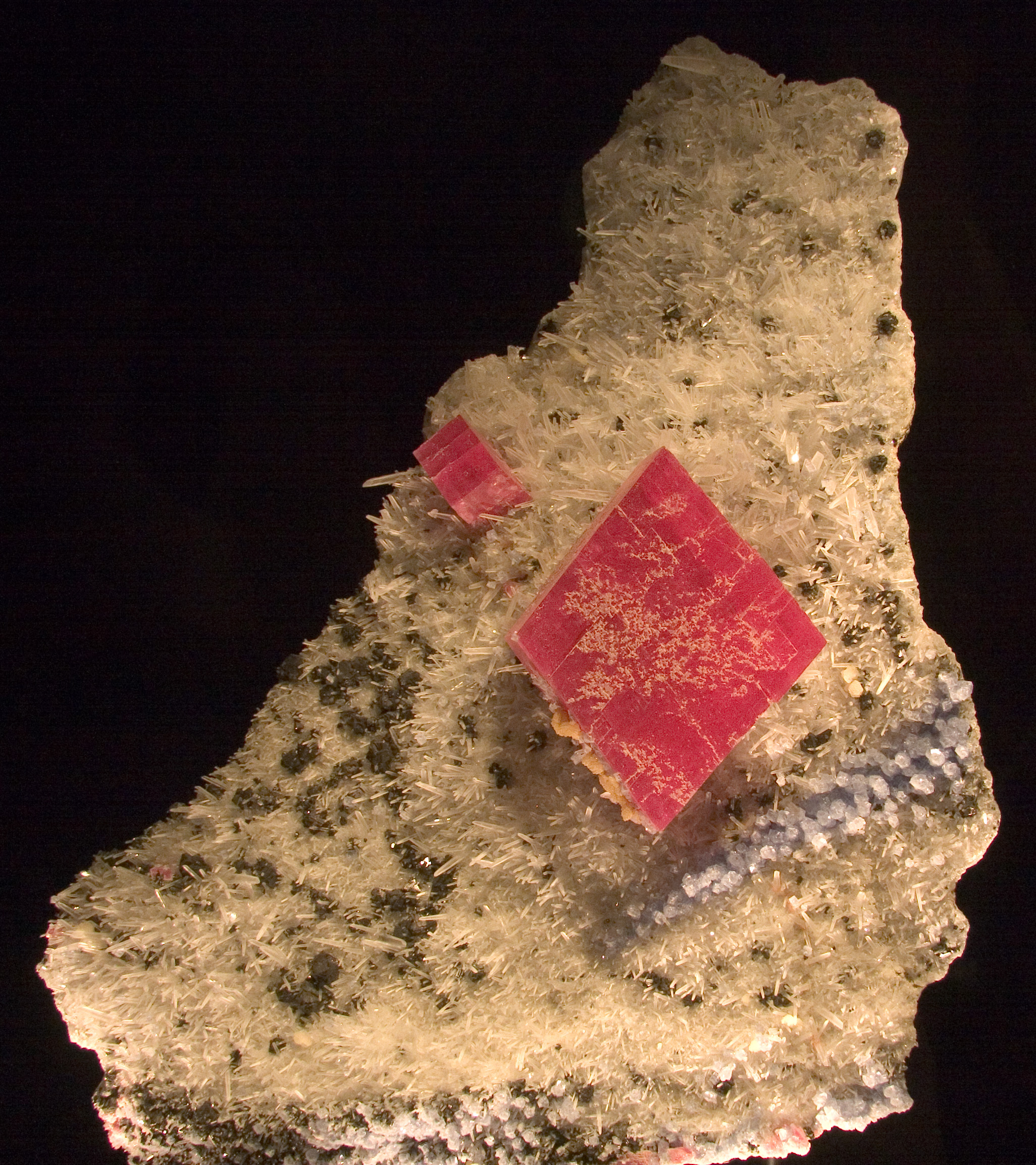
The "Alma King", the world's largest rhodochrosite crystal

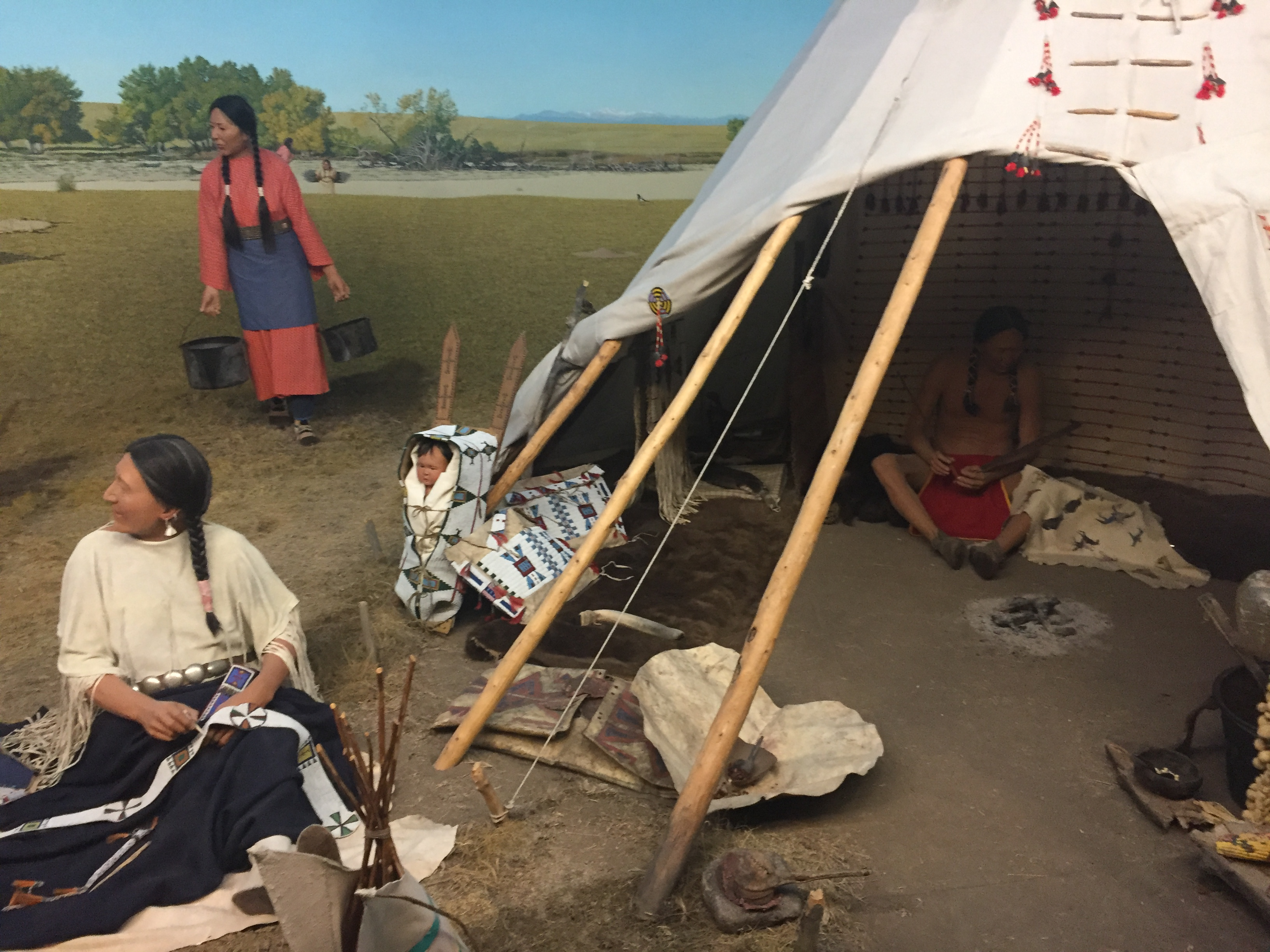
Diorama from the 'North American Indian Cultures' exhibit, depicting a group of Cheyenne Indians in the 1860s near modern-day Denver

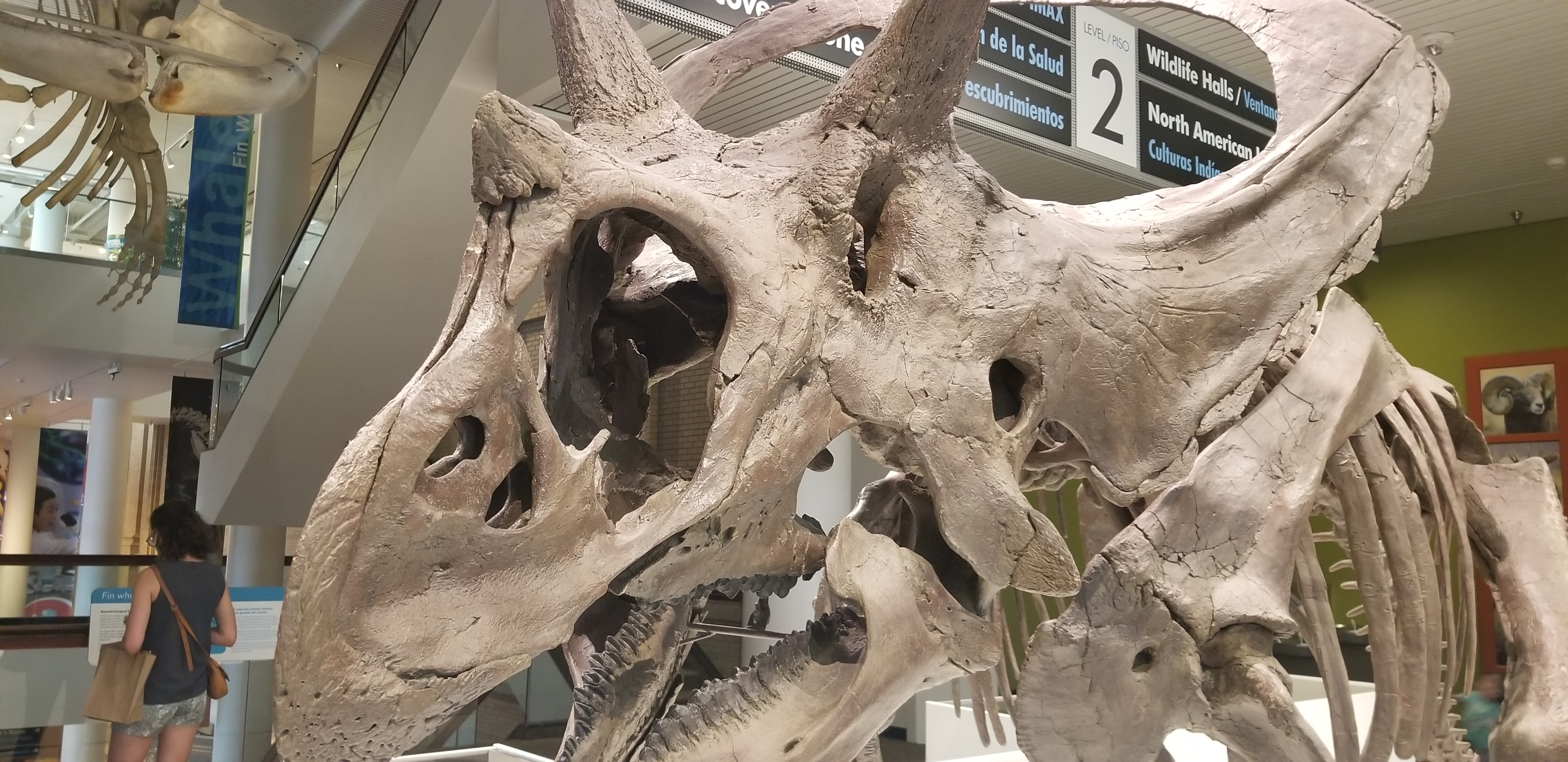
Tiny the Torosaurus at Denver Museum of Nature and Science

Dinosaur sculpture next to the Museum's parking structure

== See also ==
- List of landmarks of Denver
- List of museums in Colorado
- Snowmastodon site
- Making North America (film) – features V.P. Kirk Johnson
