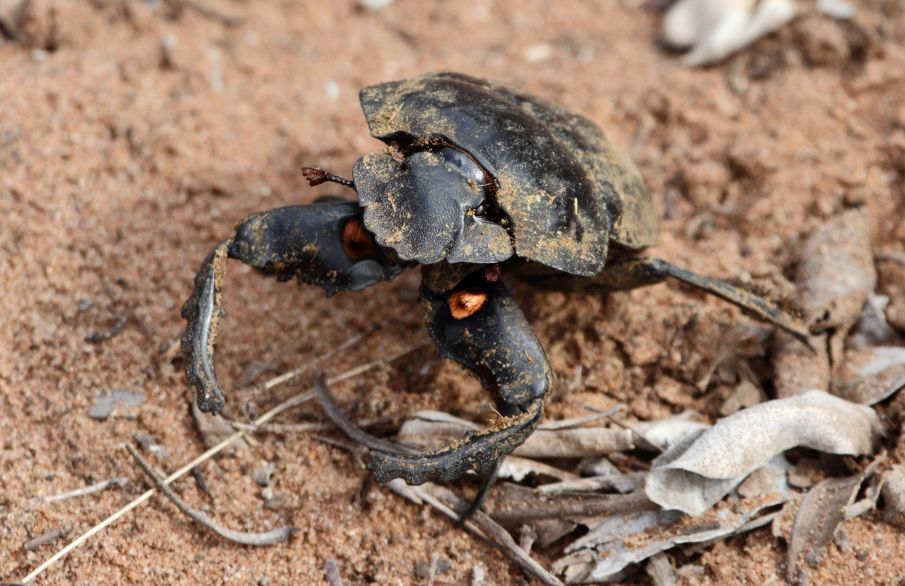
- Pachylomera femoralis

Scientific classification
- Domain: Eukaryota
- Kingdom: Animalia
- Phylum: Arthropoda
- Class: Insecta
- Order: Coleoptera
- Suborder: Polyphaga
- Infraorder: Scarabaeiformia
- Family: Scarabaeidae
- Subfamily: Scarabaeinae
- Tribe: Scarabaeini
- Genus: Pachylomera; Kirby, 1828

Synonyms
- Pachylomerus Bertoloni, 1849

= Pachylomera =

Genus of dung beetles

Pachylomera is a genus of dung beetle from the family Scarabaeidae and tribe Scarabaeini, with records from Africa south of the equator.

== Species and description ==
BioLib lists:

1. Pachylomera femoralis Kirby, 1828 - type species
2. Pachylomera opaca Lansberge, 1874

P. femoralis is the largest flying, ball-rolling dung beetle in the world. The front legs are particularly strong, with the flattened leg appendages: it walks with these while rolling balls of buffalo and elephant dung.
