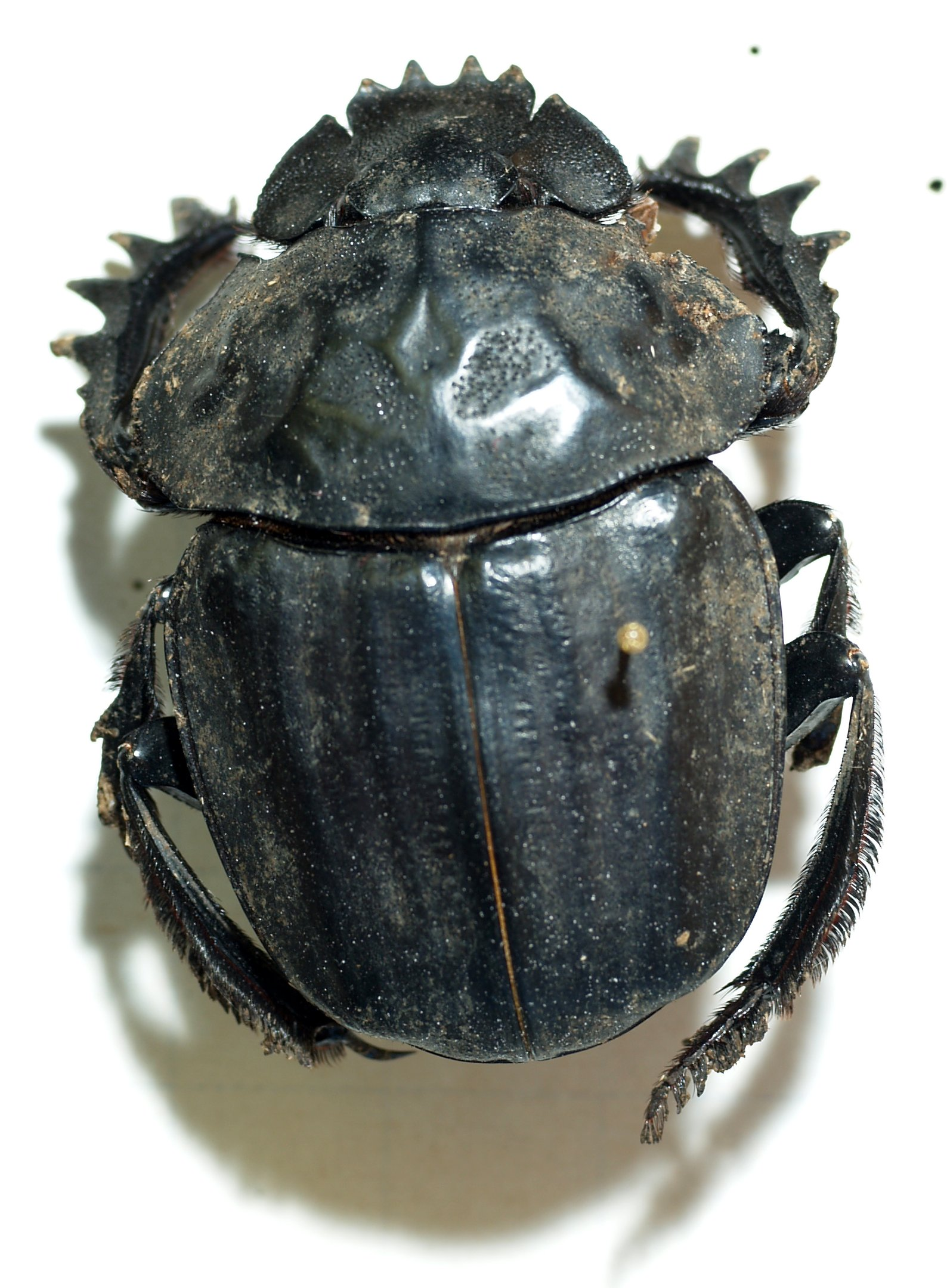

Scientific classification
- Domain: Eukaryota
- Kingdom: Animalia
- Phylum: Arthropoda
- Class: Insecta
- Order: Coleoptera
- Suborder: Polyphaga
- Infraorder: Scarabaeiformia
- Family: Scarabaeidae
- Subfamily: Scarabaeinae
- Tribe: Scarabaeini
- Genus: Pachylomera
- Species: P. femoralis

Binomial name
- Pachylomera femoralis Kirby, 1828

Synonyms
- Ateuchus horridus Boheman, 1857; Pachylomerus femoralis Kirby, 1828

= Pachylomera femoralis =

Flattenened giant dung beetle

Species of beetle

Pachylomera femoralis is a species of blackish gray dung beetle from the family Scarabaeidae, which is widespread in the woodland and savannah regions of Africa south of the equator.

== Range ==
It has been recorded in the Tanzania, DRC, Mozambique, Angola, Zimbabwe, Namibia, Botswana and South Africa.

== Biology ==
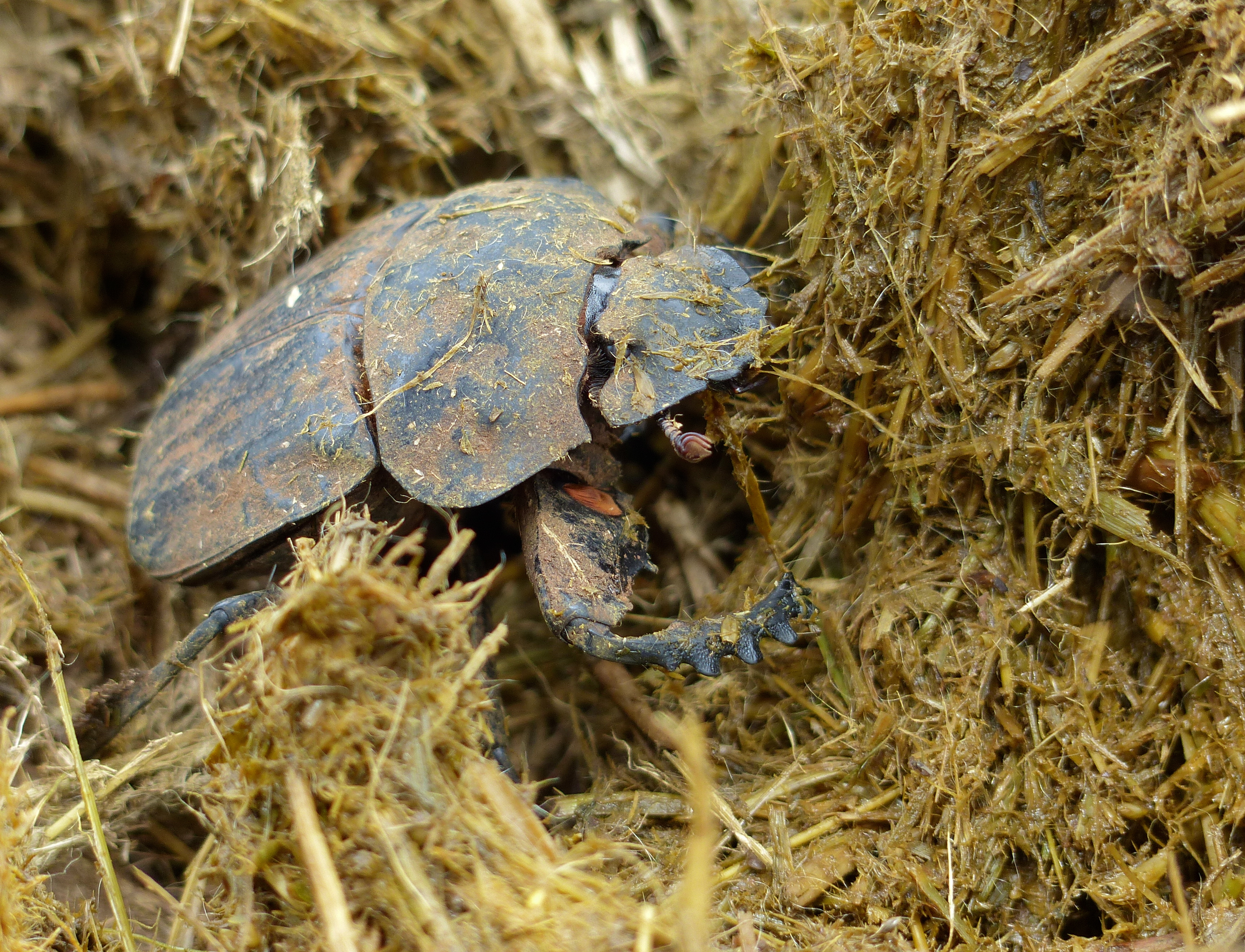
Male in elephant dung, showing rufous velvet patch on front leg.

It is the largest flying, ball-rolling dung beetle in the world. The front legs, that it walks on while rolling the dung ball, are particularly strong. It specializes to some extent on buffalo and elephant dung and constructs a large ball, with the flattened leg appendages. The front legs have a rufous velvet patch each, that are used to wipe the eyes clean. The eyes are oriented to provide a good downward view while flying. The dung ball is rolled away from their con-specific competitors and buried in the ground. The male forms the dung ball for breeding, and a female will approach and assist in rolling a dung ball which is to her liking.
