= Dacke (disambiguation) =

Dacke may refer to:

- Nils Dacke (died 1543), Swedish rebel leader
- Marie Dacke (born 1973), Swedish biologist
- Fabian Månsson (1872–1938), Swedish politician
- 7217 Dacke, an asteroid

== See also ==
- Dacke War, the conflict between Nils Dacke and Gustav Vasa
