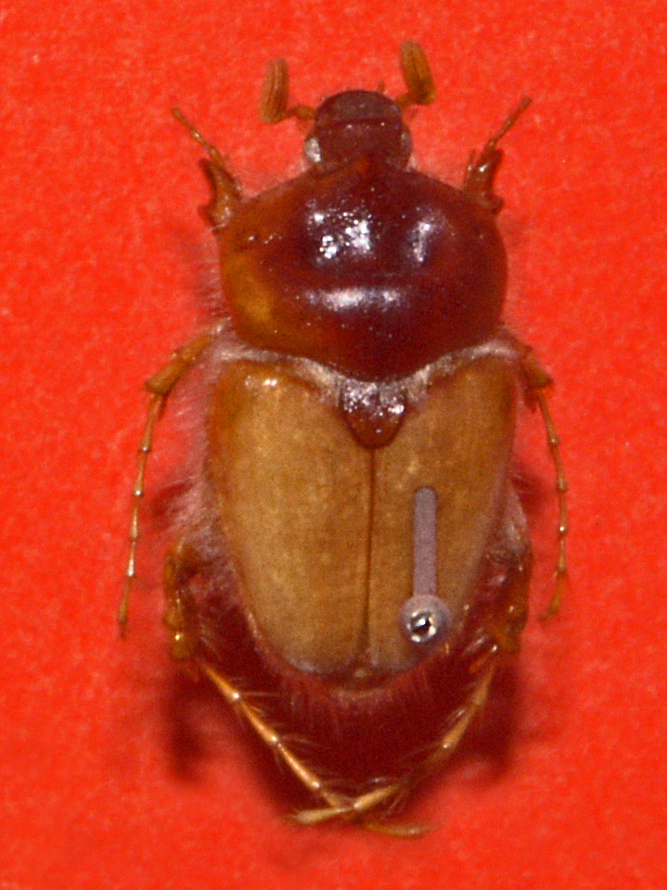
- Pachypus caesus, male. Museum specimen

Scientific classification
- Kingdom: Animalia
- Phylum: Arthropoda
- Clade: Pancrustacea
- Class: Insecta
- Order: Coleoptera
- Suborder: Polyphaga
- Infraorder: Scarabaeiformia
- Family: Scarabaeidae
- Genus: Pachypus
- Species: P. caesus

Binomial name
- Pachypus caesus Erichson, 1840

Synonyms
- Pachypus intermedius Ragusa, 1892; Pachypus rubrothorax Vitale, 1927; Pachypus siculus Castelnau, 1840

= Pachypus caesus =

Species of beetle

Pachypus caesus is a species of dung beetle in the family Scarabaeidae.

== Description ==
Pachypus caesus can reach a length of 17–19 millimetres (0.67–0.75 in). In the typical form the prothorax of the males is blackish, while elytrae are completely black. The females are reddish and apterous.

== Distribution ==
This species is endemic to Sicily.

== Bibliography ==
- Vitale F. (1927) Poche osservazioni sul Pachypus caesus Er., Bollettino della Societa Entomologica Italiana. Genova 59:4-7
- VITALE, F. 1908. Notizie su alcuni insetti rari del Messinese. I. Il Rhizotrogus tarsalis Reiche e la sua dimora. II. La fem. del Pachypus caesus Erichson e la sua galleria. Il Naturalista siciliano. Giornale di Scienze naturali, Palermo (II) 20 : 84-92
- ARNONE, M. & SPARACIO, I. 1990. Il Pachypus caesus Erichson 1840: brevi note sulla biologia e la distribuzione in Sicilia. Il Naturalista siciliano. Giornale di Scienze naturali, Palermo (IV) 14 (1-2): 63-71
- FURLAN, L. 1985. Ulteriori acquisizioni sul comportamento di Pleurophorus caesus (Creutzer) (Col. Scarabaeidae). Bollettino della Società entomologica italiana, Genova 117 (4-7): 97-101
- Ragusa E. (1892) Catalogo ragionato dei Coleotteri di Sicilia, Il Naturalista siciliano. Giornale di Scienze naturali. Palermo 12:1-19; 201-205; 233-239; 265-271
- Castelnau F. (1840) Histoire Naturelle des Insectes Coléoptères. Avec une introduction renfermant L'Anatomie et la Physiologie des Animaux Articulés, par M.Brullé, P.Duménil. Paris 2:1-564
- Erichson W.F. (1840) Die Pachypoden, eine kleine Gruppe aus der Familie der Melolonthen. Entomographien, Untersuchungen in dem Gebiete der Entomologie mit besonderer Benutzung der Königl. Sammlung in Berlin, Morin. Berlin 1:29-43
- Scarabs: World Scarabaeidae Database. Schoolmeesters P.
