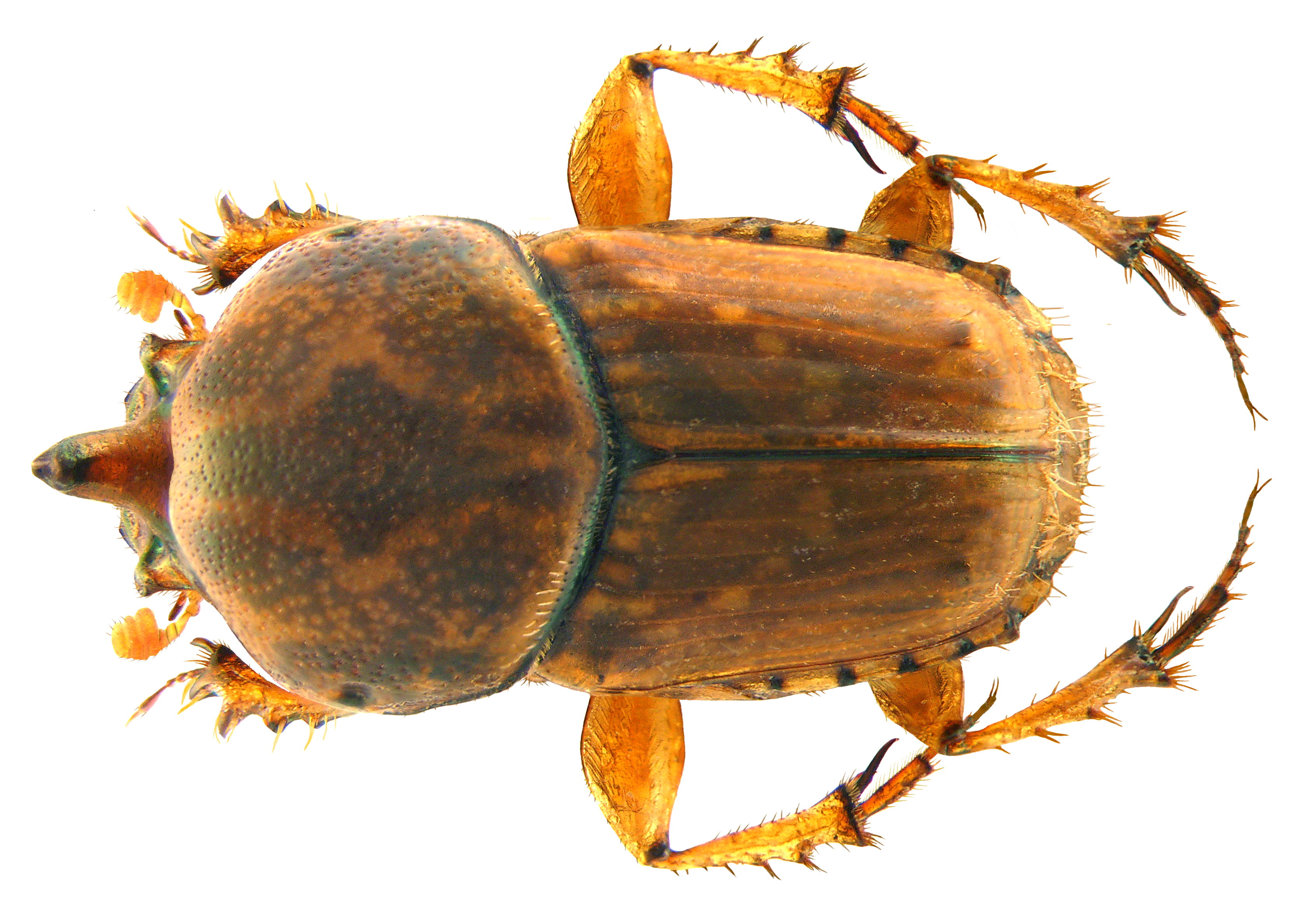
- Euoniticellus intermedius
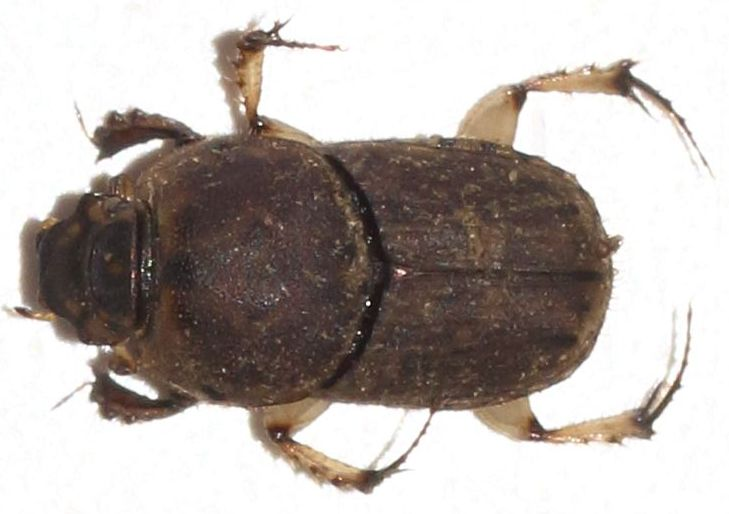
- Euoniticellus africanus

Scientific classification
- Domain: Eukaryota
- Kingdom: Animalia
- Phylum: Arthropoda
- Class: Insecta
- Order: Coleoptera
- Suborder: Polyphaga
- Infraorder: Scarabaeiformia
- Family: Scarabaeidae
- Tribe: Oniticellini
- Genus: Euoniticellus

= Euoniticellus =

Genus of beetles

Euoniticellus is a genus of dung beetles in the subfamily Scarabaeinae of the scarab beetle family.

Four species from this genus (E. africanus, E. fulvus, E. intermedius, E. pallipes) were introduced into Australia as part of the Australian Dung Beetle Project, and became established there.

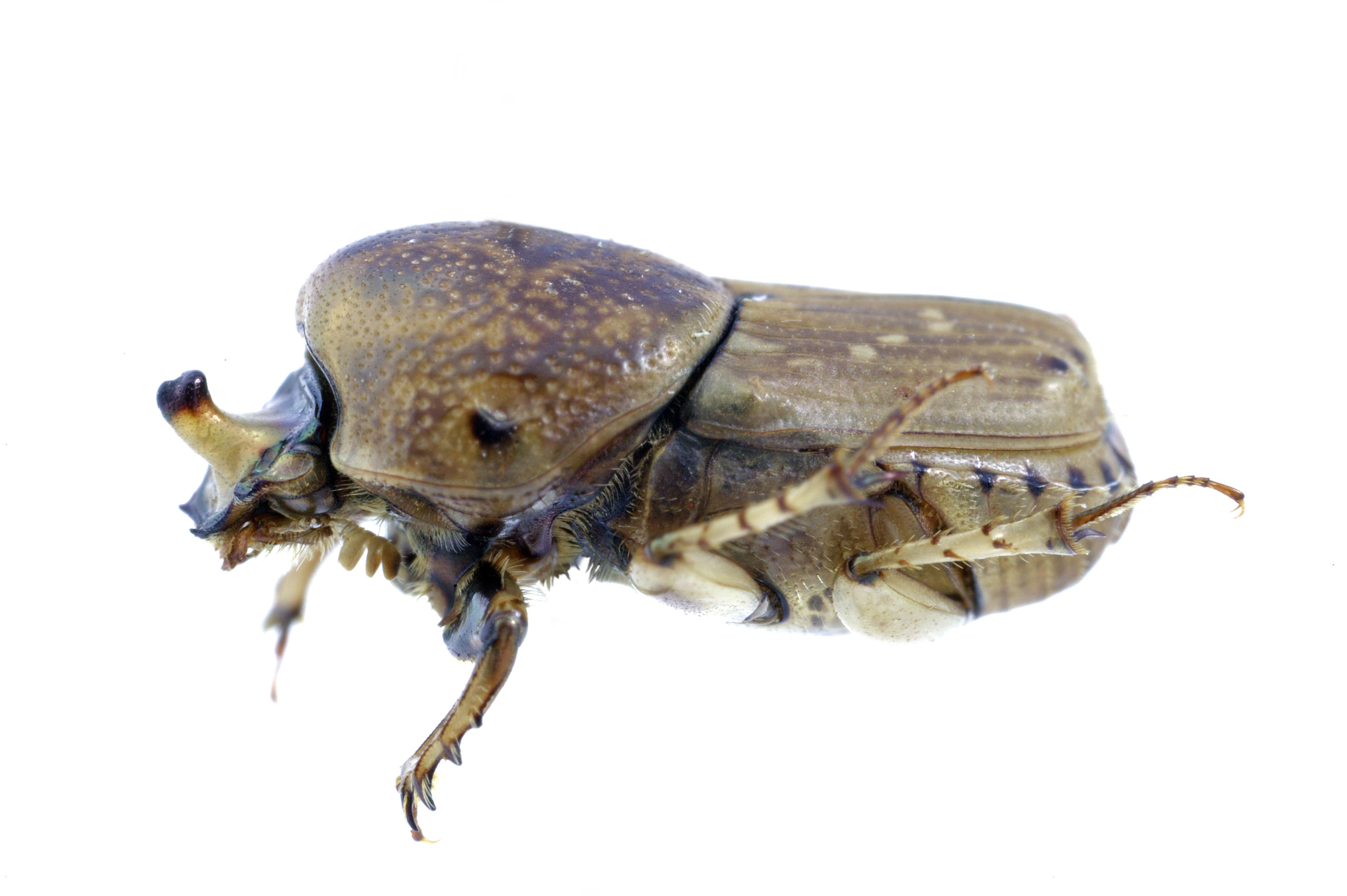
Euoniticellus intermedius

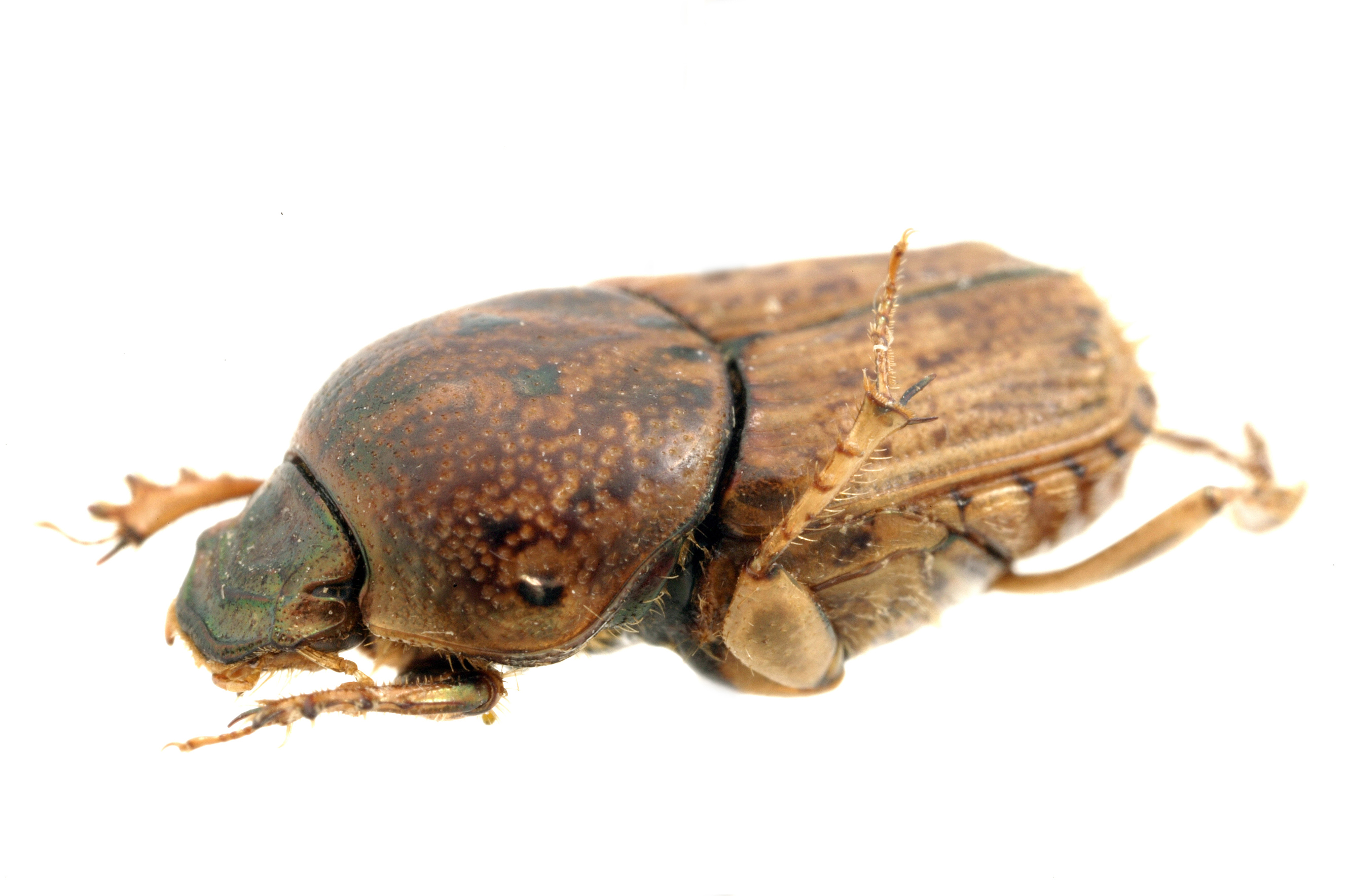
Euoniticellus africanus

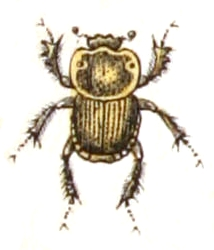
Euoniticellus fulvus

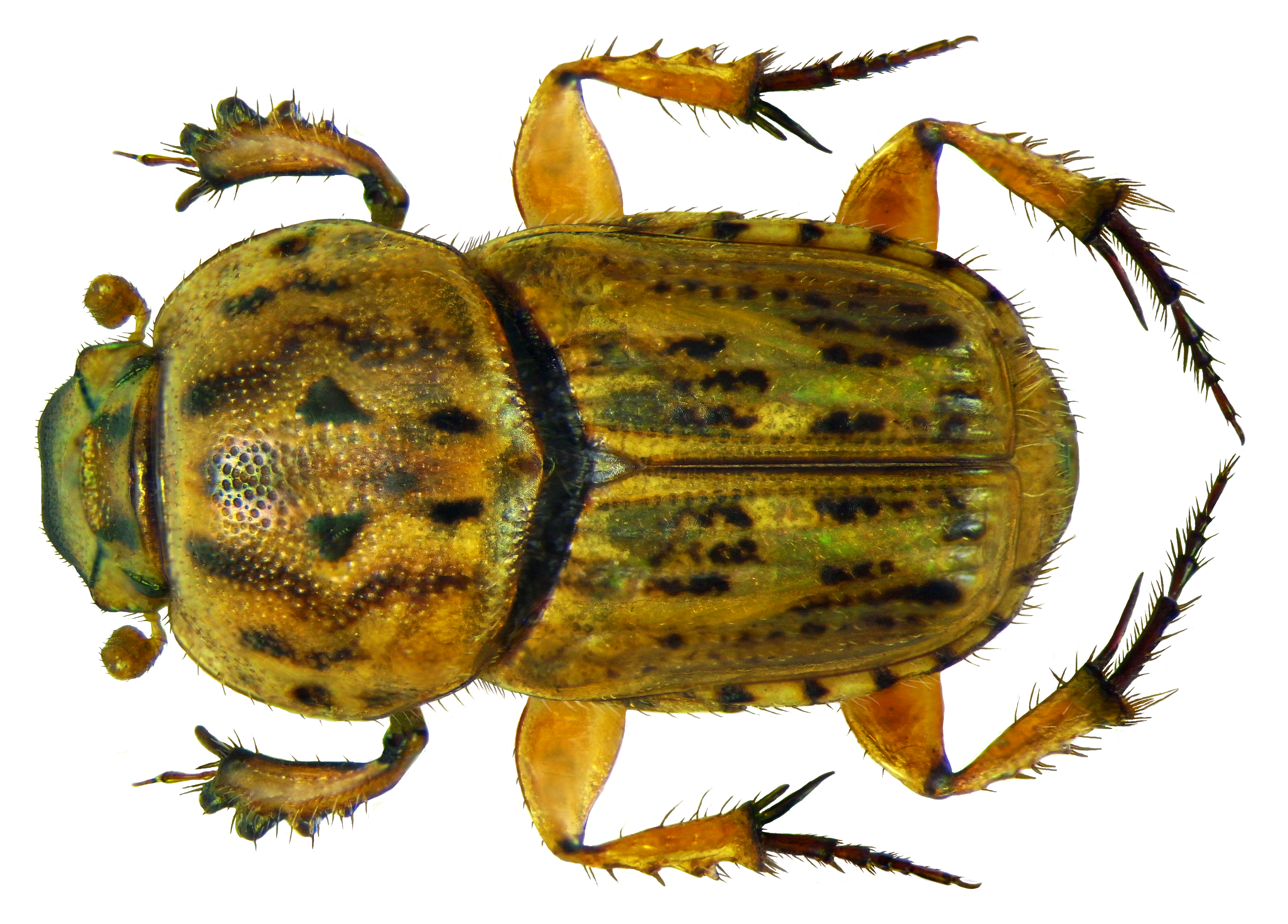
Euoniticellus pallens

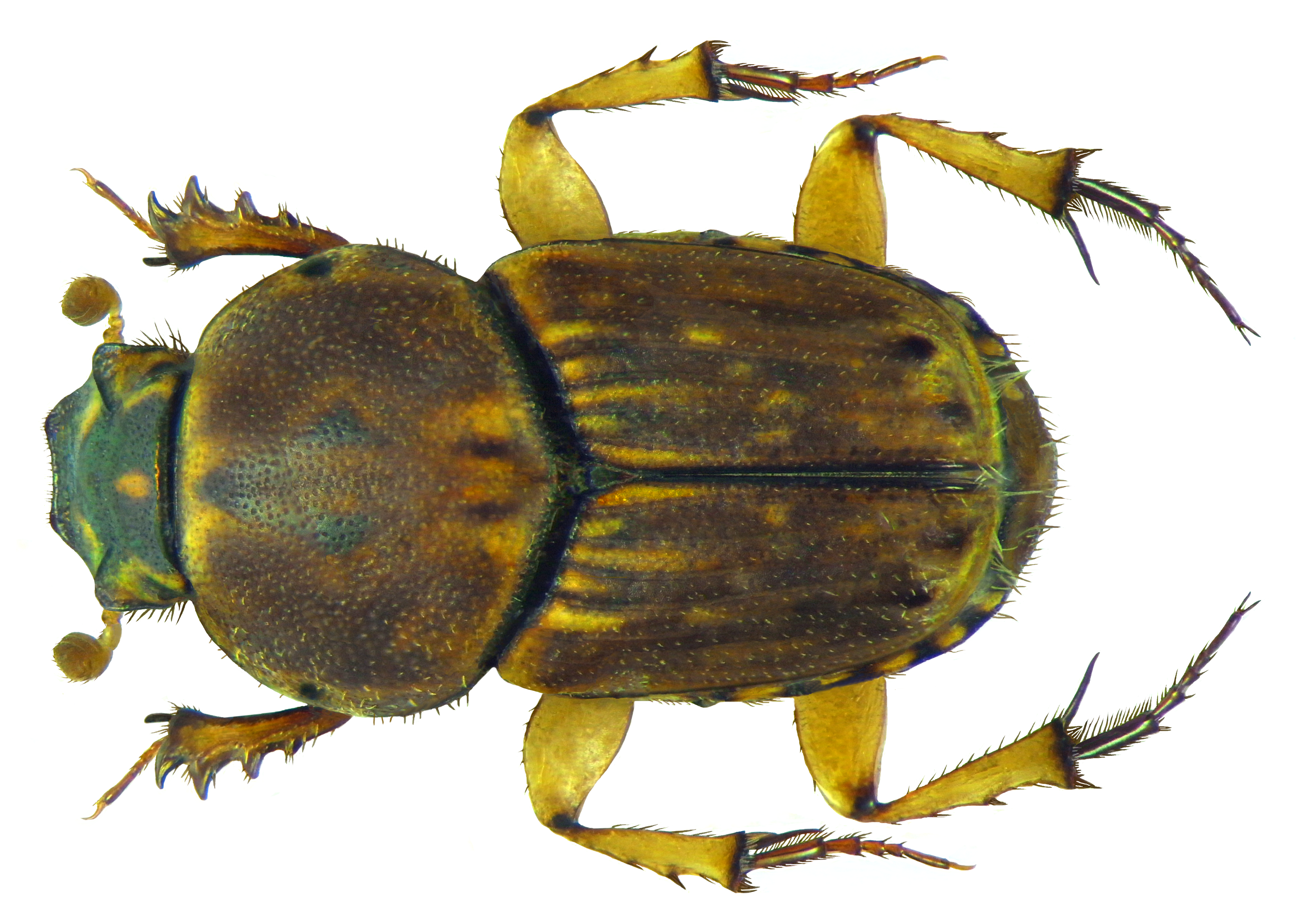
Euoniticellus triangulatus
