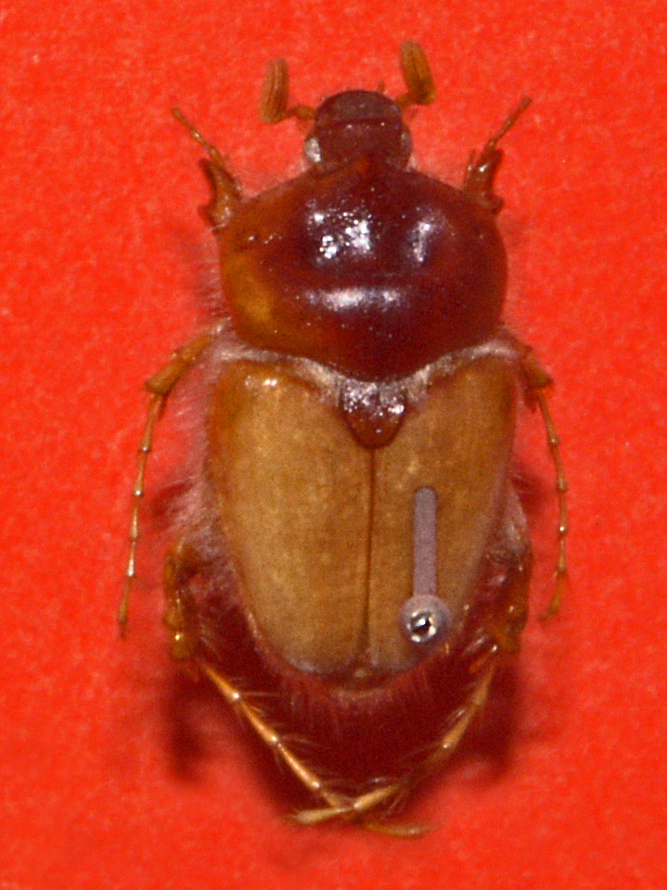
- Pachypus caesus

Scientific classification
- Kingdom: Animalia
- Phylum: Arthropoda
- Class: Insecta
- Order: Coleoptera
- Suborder: Polyphaga
- Infraorder: Scarabaeiformia
- Family: Scarabaeidae
- Subfamily: Melolonthinae
- Genus: Pachypus; Dejean, 1821

= Pachypus =

Genus of beetles

Pachypus is a genus of dung beetle in the family Scarabaeidae.

== Species ==
- Pachypus caesus Erichson, 1840
- Pachypus candidae (Petagna, 1786)
