= Diapterna pinguella =

Scientific classification
- Kingdom: Animalia
- Phylum: Arthropoda
- Clade: Pancrustacea
- Class: Insecta
- Order: Coleoptera
- Suborder: Polyphaga
- Infraorder: Scarabaeiformia
- Family: Scarabaeidae
- Genus: Diapterna
- Species: D. pinguella

Binomial name
- Diapterna pinguella (Brown, 1929)

Synonyms
- Aphodius (Diapterna) pingellus Brown, 1929

Species of beetle

Diapterna pinguella is a species of aphodiine dung beetle in the family Scarabaeidae. It is found in Canada (Alberta, British Columbia, Manitoba, Saskatchewan) and the United States (California, Colorado, New Mexico, North Dakota).
