= Ataenius inquisitus =

Scientific classification
- Kingdom: Animalia
- Phylum: Arthropoda
- Clade: Pancrustacea
- Class: Insecta
- Order: Coleoptera
- Suborder: Polyphaga
- Infraorder: Scarabaeiformia
- Family: Scarabaeidae
- Genus: Ataenius
- Species: A. inquisitus

Binomial name
- Ataenius inquisitus Horn, 1887

Species of beetle

Ataenius inquisitus is a species of aphodiine dung beetle in the family Scarabaeidae. It is found in the United States (Arizona, Texas) and Mexico (Chiapas, Hidalgo, San Luis Potosí, Tamaulipas, Veracruz).
