= Marcus Byrne =

South African zoologist and entomologist

- Education: University of the Witwatersrand; University of London
- Known for: Dung beetle research winning Ig Nobel Prize
- Scientific career
- Fields: Entomology; Zoology
- Workplaces: University of the Witwatersrand

Marcus John Byrne is a British-South African zoologist and entomologist. Byrne won the 2013 Ig Nobel Prize for Biology/Astronomy along with Marie Dacke, Emily Baird, Clarke Scholtz, and Eric Warrant, for discovering that when dung beetles get lost, they can navigate their way home by looking at the Milky Way.

Byrne is a professor emeritus of zoology and entomology at the University of the Witwatersrand in Johannesburg, South Africa. His research covers biocontrol of alien invasive weeds, and dung beetle behaviour and physiology.

Byrne is co-author of the book Dance of the Dung Beetles and a TED talk presenter.
