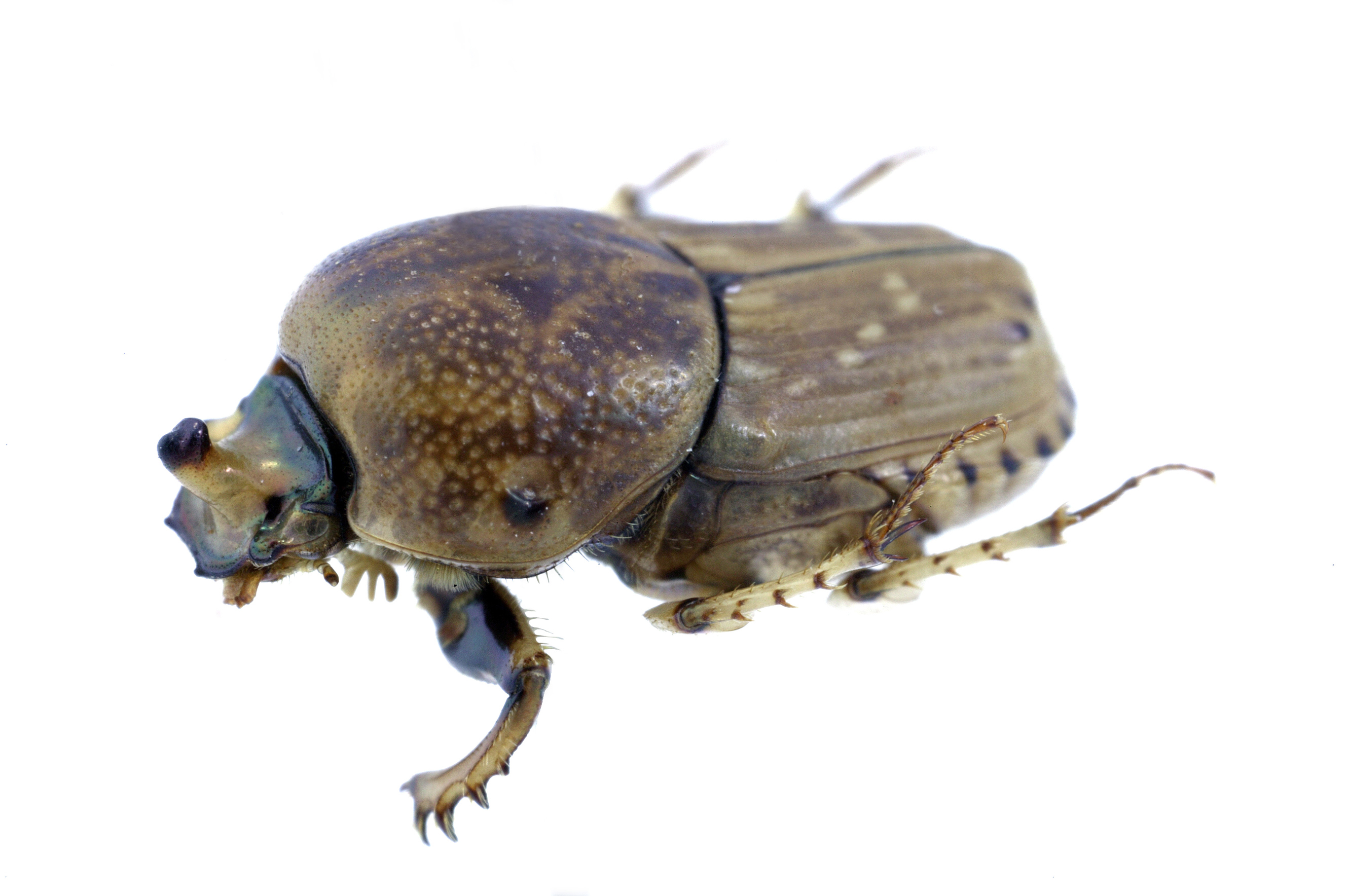

Scientific classification
- Kingdom: Animalia
- Phylum: Arthropoda
- Class: Insecta
- Order: Coleoptera
- Suborder: Polyphaga
- Infraorder: Scarabaeiformia
- Family: Scarabaeidae
- Genus: Euoniticellus
- Species: E. intermedius

Binomial name
- Euoniticellus intermedius (Reiche, 1849)

= Euoniticellus intermedius =

Species of beetle

Euoniticellus intermedius (also known as the Northern Sandy Dung Beetle) is a species of dung beetle in the family Scarabaeidae. E. intermedius is native to Southeastern Africa but has spread to the United States, Mexico, and Australia. E. intermedius acts as an important agricultural agent due to its improvement of soil quality and removal of parasitic pests.

Adults of the species are brown in color and exhibit sexual dimorphism. Males can be identifying by their blunt, curved horns, which are used to fight with other males for female mates.

These beetles spend their entire lives in dung pads. They are of the tunneling variety of dung beetles, which bring dung into their tunnels as opposed to living in the dung or rolling the dung away.

== Description ==
Adults are generally 6mm to 10mm long. Younger adults tend to be light brown or tan in color, though their thoraxes are darker. Older adults tend to be a darker brown and more uniformly colored. The brown coloring of adults and the adherence of dried dung to their shells allows adult beetles to camouflage into their surroundings.

E. intermedius exhibits sexual dimorphism, with males possessing blunt, curved horns that females do not. Males also possess thinner, curvier fore tibia and more swollen anterior dorsal portions as compared to females.

== Geographic range ==
E. intermedius originates from the Afrotropical realm with distribution ranging from Ethiopia to South Africa. It has since spread into other geographical regions both intentionally and unintentionally.

These beetles were introduced to Australia from South Africa in 1971 for agricultural purposes. They are now in all of Australia's mainland states except for Victoria.

This species was then introduced to the United States for similar agricultural reasons. E. intermedius was first released into Hawaii from Australia in 1974. This species was then brought to California, Texas, and Georgia in the 1970s and 1980s. It has also been found in Florida, but distribution patterns in the rest of the United States remain unclear.

E. intermedius has also spread throughout most of Mexico from its northern border with the United States to its southern border with Guatemala. Despite not having been released in Mexico, these beetles have been identified in 15 of the 32 Mexican states.

== Habitat ==
These beetles are generally distributed throughout the entirety of the geographical regions in which they are found but are more prevalent in areas associated with livestock or pastures. Their successful spread has been attributed to their high fecundity, adaptability, and vagility.

E. intermedius is highly tolerant of hot, arid conditions. Though attracted to fresher dung, these beetles are able to undergo their entire life cycle using dry feces under drought conditions. These beetles are able to produce high brood numbers under the wilting point but can also resorb ovarian oocytes under stressful conditions. E. intermedius are able to survive in a broader thermal window than other dung beetle species. They are also highly resistant to agrochemicals and active during the afternoon when most dung beetle species are dormant.

E. intermedius's high tolerance for extreme conditions and avoidance of competition with other dung beetle species have allowed it to act as a successful invader and spread to regions with a variety of climates.

== Food resources ==
E. intermedius feed on dung similarly to other dung beetle species. This species exhibits a strong preference for cow dung and dung that is no older than 36 hours. The adults primarily feed on the nutritionally rich particulate portion of the dung. The larvae differ in that they consume coarser, fibrous portions of the dung.

Larvae and adults possess differing anatomical adaptations that support their differing diets. Larvae have a compartmentalized hindgut, which likely contains symbiotic bacteria that help digest the cellulose in plant fibers. This anatomical feature disappears in adult beetles. Larvae also have ancestral, sclerotized mandibles that allow them to consume tougher portions of the dung, while adults have specialized, soft mandibles that facilitate the consumption of softer dung.

== Life history ==
As beetles, E. intermedius undergoes complete metamorphosis with egg, larval, pupal, and adult states. Adults take around six weeks to develop from eggs and live for approximately two months afterward. Studies have found that temperature poses a strong effect on their life cycle. Cooler temperatures slow down the timeline of their life cycle up to the point of halting development. Warmer temperatures shortened the beetles’ lifespan and led to greater egg production.

=== Egg ===
Eggs are 2mm egg that is bean-like in shape and pearly-white in color. Eggs are laid within the egg chambers of their own individual brood balls. The eggs take approximately one week to hatch into larvae.

=== Larva ===
Larvae of E. intermedius appear similar to those of other dung beetle species, with a dorsal expansion and caudal flattening that help the larvae move within the brood ball. Larvae undergo three instars over the course of a week, growing from 2.5mm to 8mm over the course of all three instars. First-instar larvae have soft, round, milky-white head capsules. Second-instar and third-instar larvae are anatomically identical to first-instar larvae aside from having light-yellow and straw-colored head capsules. Larvae begin feeding during the second instar and create a pupation chamber out of their own excrement at the end of the third instar.

=== Pupa ===
The pupa of E. intermedius lasts for approximately two weeks, with pupae being around 10mm in length. Their pupa are white and morphologically quite different from third-instar larvae. Pupae possess a calluslike pronotal support projection and fingerlike lateral and dorsal tergal support projections along with calluslike caudal projections sometimes.

=== Adult ===
After approximately two weeks as pupae (six weeks total), the pupa emerge as 10mm teneral imago emerge. Adult beetles then spend the majority of their time feeding on and tunneling in their dung pad as they sexually mature.

Similarly to other dung beetles, E. intermedius construct dung balls from dung pads in order to create brood masses in which they can lay their eggs. E. intermedius are categorized as paracoprids, or tunnelers, meaning that they construct burrows underneath dung pads in which to store brood masses. The number of brood masses created vary based on dung quality and quantity, intraspecies and interspecies conflict, and environmental conditions, such as temperature and moisture.

After achieving sexual maturity, male and female beetles construct brood masses in tunnels under dung pads collaboratively, though research studies have found that females are able to do so independently. The female beetle typically forms the brood mass while the male beetle transports mass from the dung pad to the female.

E. intermedius produces brood masses consisting of a dung shell surrounding an egg chamber. E. intermedius has been found to produce egg chambers larger than other species of dung beetle. The egg chamber is lined with semiliquid dung and the egg is attached to the bottom before the egg chamber is enclosed with a fibrous aeration plug composed of dung.

E. intermedius beetles lay up to 8 eggs per nest based on environmental conditions after an embryonic period of around 4–5 days, producing an average of 120 eggs over their lifetime. Once brood formation is complete, beetles travel to find new dung pads at which to reproduce again.

== Mating ==
Studies have shown that mating is mediated by competition between male beetles. In the absence of other male competitors, male beetles will enter tunnels dug by female beetles to mate. Otherwise, male beetles will guard their female mates and fight off male competitors by pushing them out of the tunnel with their horns. Although some male beetles would either retreat before physical conflict or reenter the tunnel after being forced out, no males are able to sneak past guarding males, which is true with other beetle species. Body size and horn size are both important predictors of male success in competitions, but horn size has been found to be increasingly important with increasing body size.

=== Male/male interactions ===
The presence of horns on this species acts a secondary sexual ornament that acts as a direct indicator of a beetle's ability to win in fights against other males. Studies were conducted to correlate fighting ability with physical attributes of these beetles, taking into account features such as horn zine and body size. In competitions between males, the strength to drag their opponent out of tunnels and the endurance to withstand exhaustion were key skills that beetles must display in order to emerge victorious in fights. It was discovered that horn size and body length could be linked to these abilities. While body length is only a good predictor for the pulling force of the beetle, horn size can be used as a more accurate and reliable indicator of performance in both these areas. Body weight and horn size are positively correlated. This type of study that emphasizes an integrative approach by taking into account multiple factors when studying fighting outcomes is invaluable for understanding the evolution of these traits and behaviors.

== Interactions with humans and livestock ==
=== Agricultural use ===
E. intermedius has been intentionally introduced to ecosystems in the United States and Australia for their positive contributions to agriculture.

==== Soil quality ====
Tunnelling by E. intermedius improves the soil quality through percolation and aeration. This allows for increased water infiltration, leading to increased soil moisture, decreased soil density, and reduced surface water runoff culminating in decreased soil erosion. This allows for greater soil quality on agricultural land, which promotes plant growth. Similar effects have been observed when studied in the extremely degraded soil of coal mines.

Dung consumption and transportation by these beetles contributes to nutrient recycling. Incorporation of manure into the soil from the surface allows nitrogen that would otherwise have been almost entirely lost through volatilization to be used by plants. Additionally, larvae leave behind the uneaten portions of their brood balls as organic matter with which soil microbes create humus, a crucial contributor to soil health.

Dung removal by E. intermedius also increases effective pasture acreage. Livestock have been shown to not graze near their own species’ manure, which is removed by these beetles.

==== Parasite control ====
Dung manipulation by E. intermedius has been shown to reduce the population of parasitic pests. E. intermedius introduction has been found to significantly decrease fly larvae emergence due to competition for dung as a food source and damage to fly eggs. E. intermedius introduction has been found to decrease gastrointestinal parasites by disrupting their eggs, which are found in the feces of cattle.

==== Herbicide and drug effects ====
E. intermedius has been used to investigate the effects of compounds and medicines used in the agricultural industry on nontarget organisms. Studies on herbicides have found that a common herbicide mixture, consisting of 2,4-dichlorophenoxyacetic acid and picloram, to pose no negative effect on E. intermedius beetles. Rather, it has been shown that application of said herbicide mixture improved the condition and size of these beetles. Studies on antiparasitic drugs have found that ivermectin injection into cattle produces ivermectin residue in cow dung, which delayed adult emergence by up to a week and decreased productivity in the first week of breeding for E. intermedius. Studies explored the survival, fecundity, and development of this species after ivermectin was introduced to cattle dung. Researchers found that adult survival was reduced to nearly 50% and eventually reached total mortality at greater concentrations. Upon closer inspection, it was noted that ivermectin didn't impact the ovary, but increased testicle size and reduced the fecundity and weight of the broods. Ivermectin increased the development time for E. intermedius which reduced their numbers. Further research involving the impact of ivermectin on E. intermedius and its surroundings are vital to understanding the implications of its use in agriculture.
