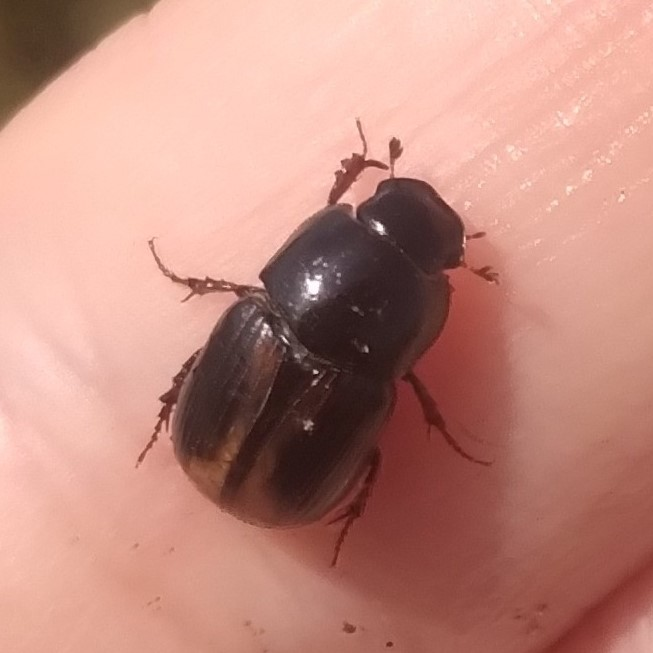

Scientific classification
- Kingdom: Animalia
- Phylum: Arthropoda
- Clade: Pancrustacea
- Class: Insecta
- Order: Coleoptera
- Suborder: Polyphaga
- Infraorder: Scarabaeiformia
- Family: Scarabaeidae
- Subfamily: Aphodiinae
- Tribe: Aphodiini
- Genus: Diapterna; Horn, 1887

Synonyms
- Aphodius (Diapterna) Horn, 1887

= Diapterna =

Genus of beetles

Diapterna is a genus of aphodiine dung beetles in the family Scarabaeidae. There are about 6 described species in Diapterna.

== Species ==
- Diapterna dugesi (Bates, 1887)
- Diapterna hamata (Say, 1824)
- Diapterna hyperborea (LeConte, 1850)
- Diapterna omissa (LeConte, 1850)
- Diapterna pinguella (Brown, 1929)
- Diapterna pinguis (Haldeman, 1848)
