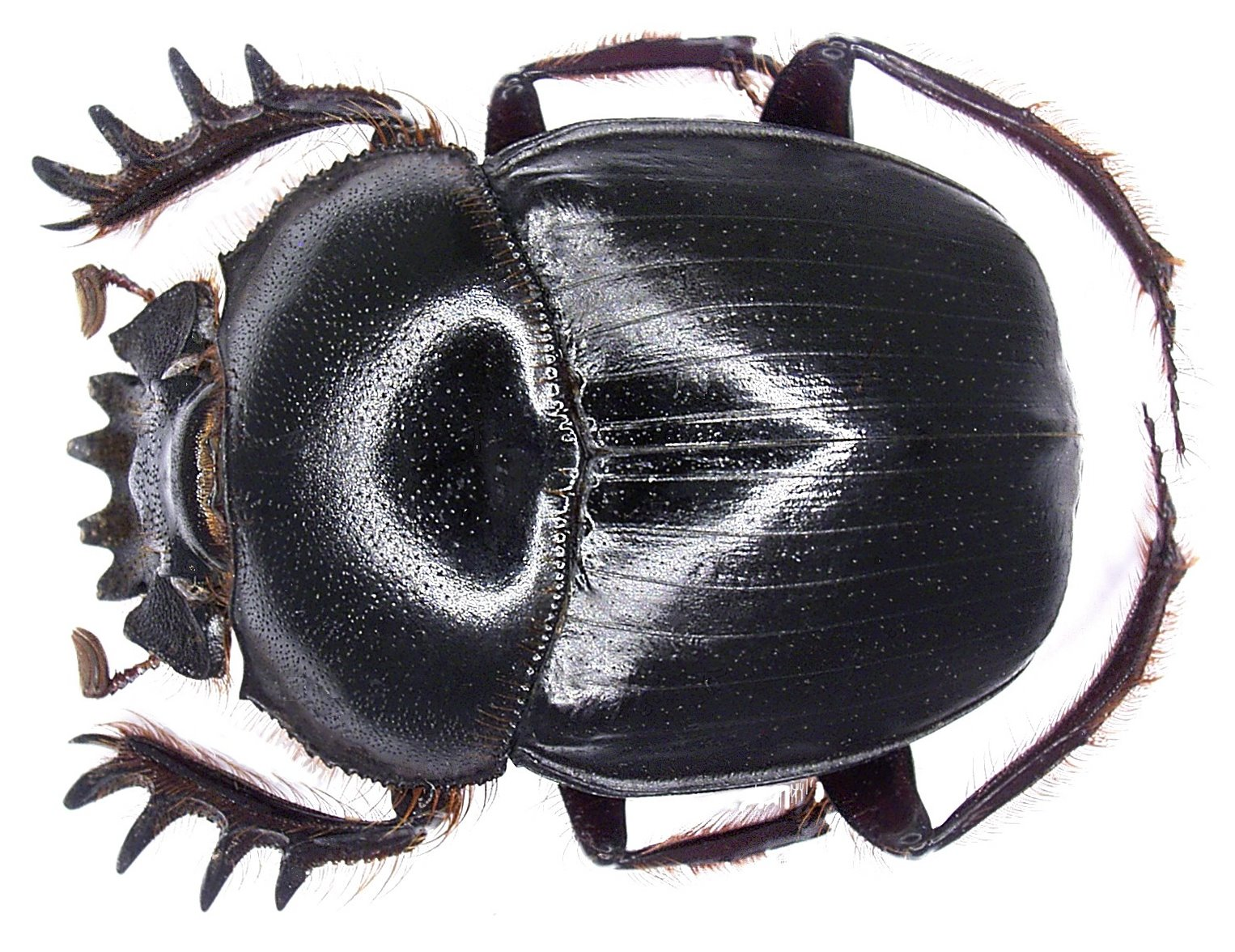

Scientific classification
- Kingdom: Animalia
- Phylum: Arthropoda
- Class: Insecta
- Order: Coleoptera
- Suborder: Polyphaga
- Infraorder: Scarabaeiformia
- Family: Scarabaeidae
- Genus: Scarabaeus
- Species: S. satyrus

Binomial name
- Scarabaeus satyrus Boheman, 1860

= Scarabaeus satyrus =

Species of beetle

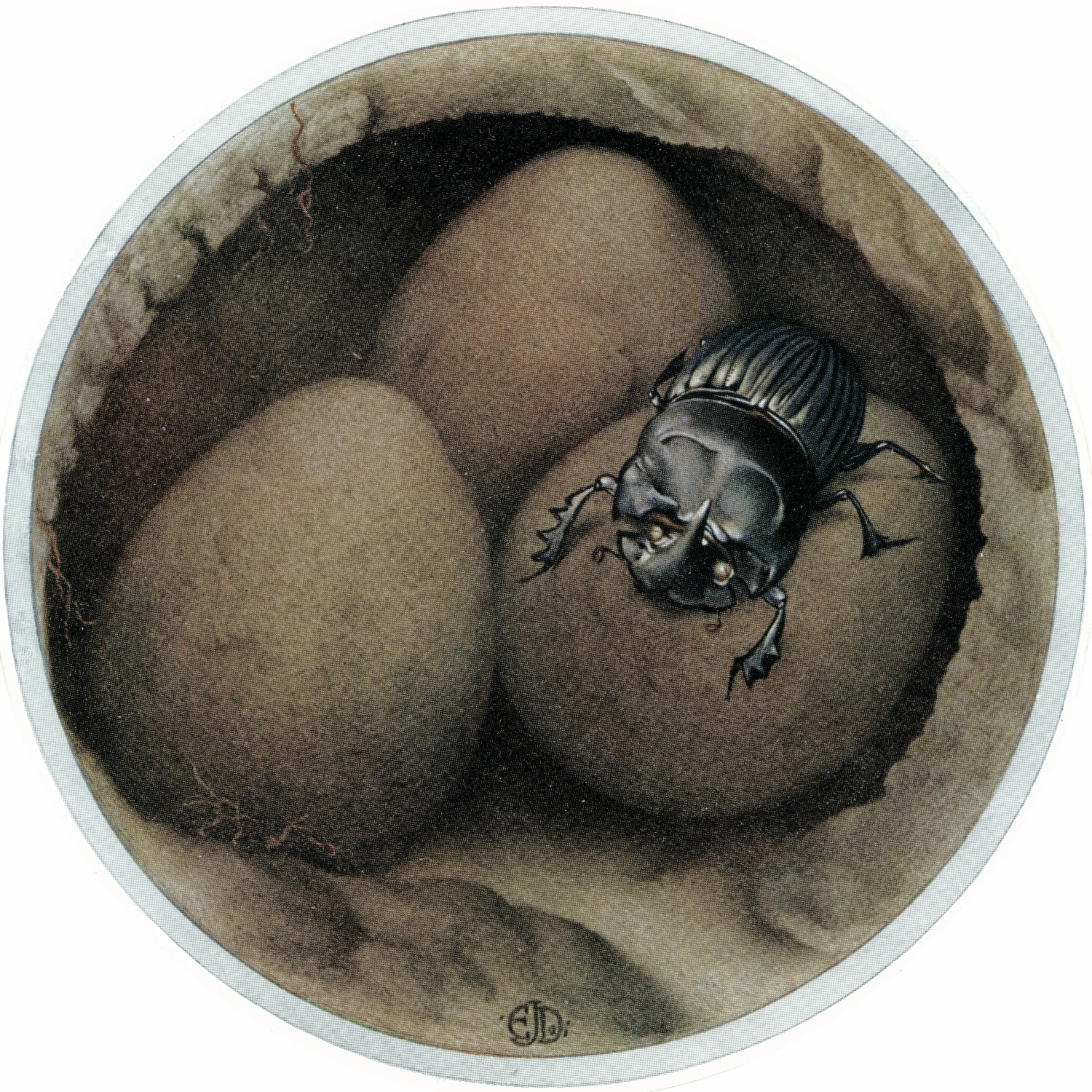
Copris hispanus in excavated chamber - Edward Julius Detmold

Scarabaeus satyrus is an African species of dung beetle. These beetles roll a ball of dung for some distance from where it was deposited, and bury it, excavating an underground chamber to house it. An egg is then laid in the ball, the growing larva feeding on the dung, pupating, and eventually emerging as an adult.

== Navigation ==
In a study by Marie Dacke published in the journal Current Biology, it is reported that researchers have found that beetles of this species use the bright glow from the Milky Way to navigate during night-time operations. Vertebrates such as humans, birds and seals are known to navigate in this way, but this could be the first insect found to do the same. Previous experiments showed that these beetles are able to steer by light from the Sun, the Moon, and polarised light emanating from these light sources. It was their ability to stay on course on clear moonless nights that puzzled researchers. Beetles were taken into the Johannesburg Planetarium where the appearance of the apparent sky could be controlled. To ensure that they were not using cues on the horizon, they were placed in a container with blackened walls. The beetles navigated best when exposed to a clear starry sky, but managed equally well when only the diffuse band of the Milky Way Galaxy was visible. It is undoubted that many other animals make use of similar techniques, some frogs, bats, moths and spiders being likely candidates.
