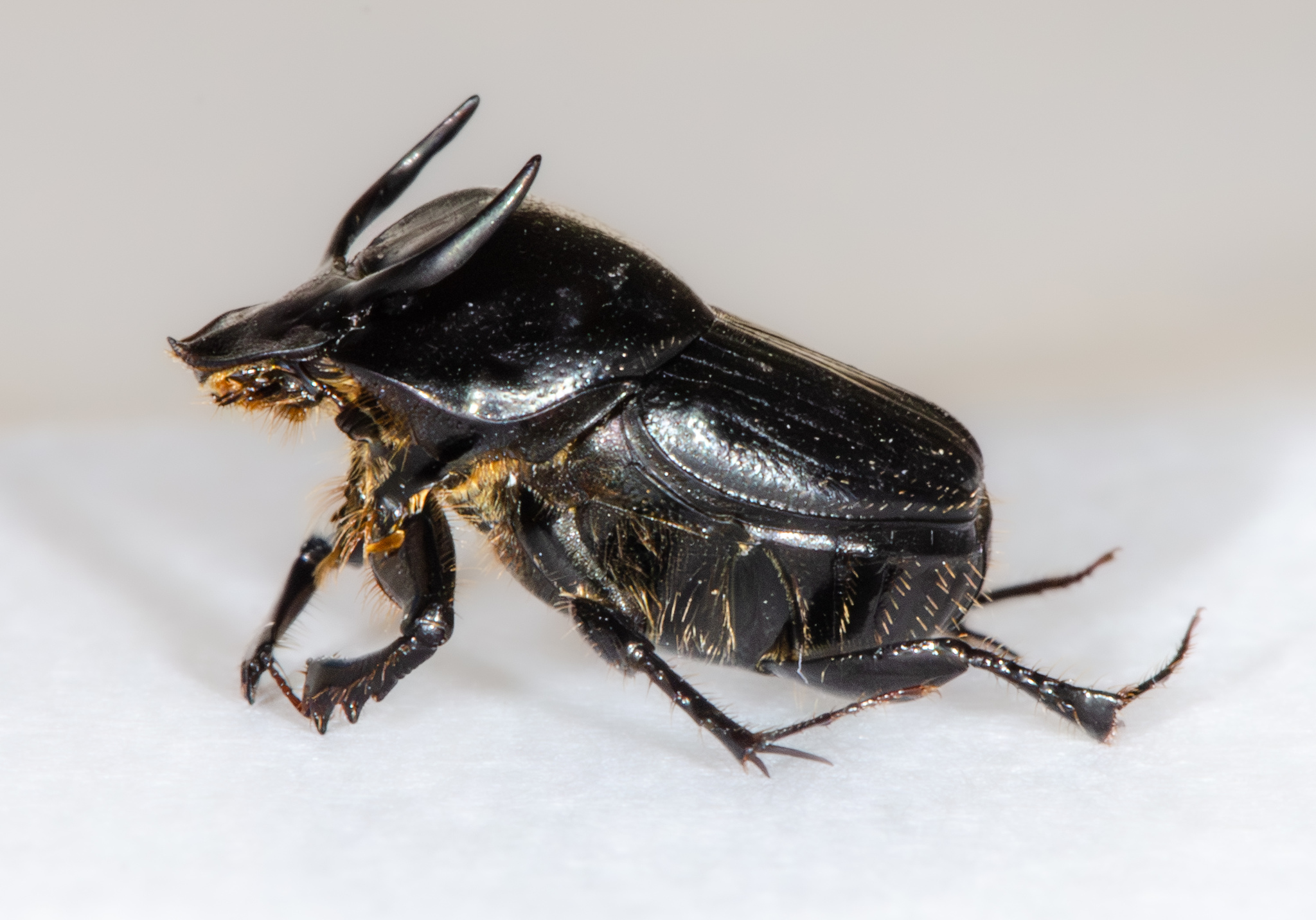
- Onthophagus taurus. Museum specimen

Scientific classification
- Kingdom: Animalia
- Phylum: Arthropoda
- Clade: Pancrustacea
- Class: Insecta
- Order: Coleoptera
- Suborder: Polyphaga
- Infraorder: Scarabaeiformia
- Family: Scarabaeidae
- Genus: Onthophagus
- Species: O. taurus

Binomial name
- Onthophagus taurus (Schreber, 1759)

= Onthophagus taurus =

Species of beetle

Onthophagus taurus, the taurus scarab, is a species of dung beetle in the genus Onthophagus and the family Scarabaeidae. Also known as the bull-headed dung beetle, it is a species that specializes in cattle dung and is widely utilized to maintain clean pastures, making it agriculturally valuable. These beetles are typically 8–10 millimetres (0.31–0.39 in) in size. The males of this species exhibit distinct characteristics: large "major" males possess long, sweeping, curved horns resembling those of a longhorn bull, while small "minor" males have tiny horns that project upward from the back of their heads. Females, on the other hand, lack horns. These small beetles are oval shaped, the color is usually black or reddish brown. Sometimes the pronotum has a weak metallic sheen.

Illustration of a male (left) and a female (right)

== Habitat ==
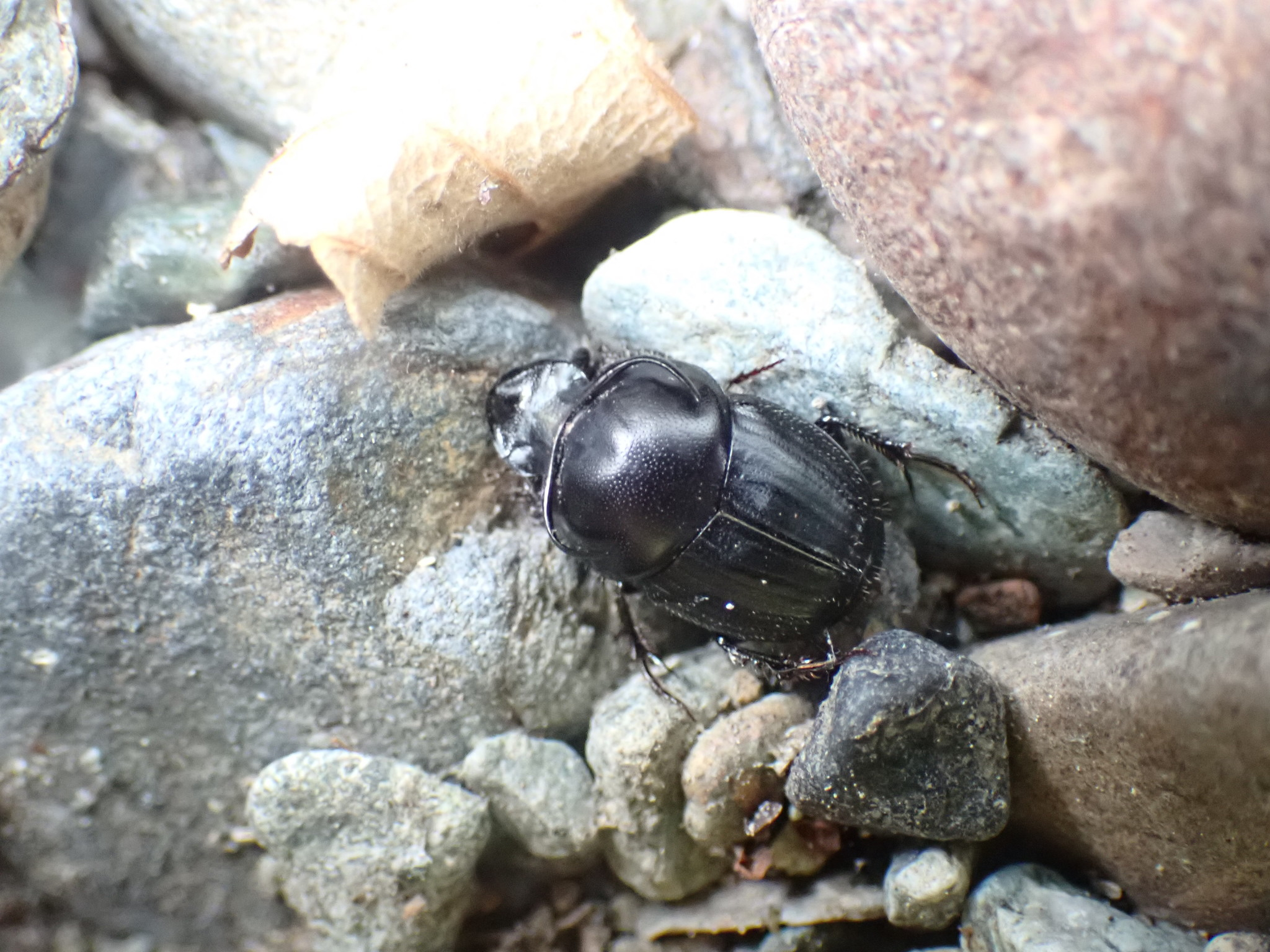

Onthophagus taurus originally inhabiting areas characterized by a Mediterranean climate, is native to central and southern Europe as well as Asia Minor, spanning from Spain to Morocco, Turkey, and Iran. It was introduced to the United States and Australia in the late 1960s to early 1970s to help manage cow dung. This introduction aimed to displace dung from cattle pastures underground, thereby, promoting soil health and pest control. They are most abundant in grassland habitats where cows reside. This species is now present in Australia, Europe, Morocco, Algeria, Tunisia, Syria, Iraq, Transcaucasia, Asia Minor, Iran, Afghanistan, Central Asia, and the United States of America.

Onthophagus taurus was accidentally introduced in the eastern United States. It was initially sighted in Florida in 1971, and later in the northeast United States. Based on the population size and spread pattern, it is suggested that O. taurus likely entered the United States from the coastal area of Florida. Subsequently, the US Department of Agriculture deliberately released O. taurus in various locations, including California, Texas, and New Jersey, resulting in a substantial increase in range from where it was first introduced.

O. taurus develops most optimally between 16 °C and 23 °C. As a result, its reproductive success is limited in extremely cold regions, restricting its distribution there. In 1974, Onthophagus taurus was introduced to Australia, collected from populations in Spain, Greece, and Turkey. It quickly became the most prevalent exotic species in southwestern Australia within two years of its introduction. It has even displaced O. binodis as it arrived initially, overtaking this earlier-introduced dung beetle species across Australia.

== Life cycle ==
=== Brood ball behavior ===
Onthophagus taurus females fly to fresh dung pads and use their mandibles to excavate tunnels into the soil below. These beetles spend days sorting through manure and arranging it throughout the tunnel. The female then carefully constructs the brood chamber using her saliva. Subsequently, they move dung down to the ends of the tunnel where they pack dung into oval brood balls, and they roll them into the dug-out brood chamber. This nesting area houses several brood balls approximately 10 – 15 cm below the surface. One egg is laid inside each brood ball where larvae would complete their development within these buried balls of manure. By storing the dung underground, it stays fresh and protects the developing grubs from predators and parasites. Adult males enter the dung pad to feed and mate. Both males and females assist in offspring provisioning. A male's primary role is to transport dung from the surface and deliver it to the female in the brood chamber, while the female's primary role is to incorporate this dung into the brood balls.

=== Growth cycle ===
The entire juvenile portion of the beetle's life cycle occurs in the brood ball. After the larva is hatched from the egg, it typically consumes 40 - 55% of the dung ball as it develops and grows. Afterward, larvae pupate inside a pupation chamber made from late larval fecal matter and leftover brood ball material, within the remains of the brood ball. Upon completing the pupal stage, the beetle becomes a fully developed adult. In the final phase of the dung beetle's life cycle, adults are ready to relocate to a fresh dung pad to initiate the cycle once more. They must then locate a mate for pair bonding and begin the process of preparing a new nesting environment.

== Polypheniesm in males ==
Male Onthophagus taurus exhibit two distinct morphs: When males exceed a critical body size, they develop a pair of long curved horns on their heads, otherwise known as large, "major" males. Smaller males remain hornless—they are known as "minor" males. Although horn size in these beetles may not be strongly heritable, the quantity of food parents supply for their larvae significantly impacts beetle morphology. Previous research indicates that both offspring size and horn length are primarily determined by the amount of dung provided to developing larvae. Moreover, isolated groups of O. taurus have exhibited variations in the shape of their fore-tibiae, a trait linked to soil density and the depth at which they dig and nest.

This is an example of polyphenism, a phenomenon where organisms with the same genetic makeup exhibit different physical traits in response to environmental factors. In the case of O. taurus, if the larva grows to a size above or below a genetically determined threshold, its development changes. More specifically, the growth of horns increases or decreases, respectively, in response to this environmental reprogramming.

== Mating ==
=== Sexual selection in males ===
Sexual selection primarily involves competition among males, which centers around methods of gaining access to the tunnels. Horned and hornless males exhibit different mating strategies. Males with horns use them as weapons in aggressive encounters with other males, particularly when competing for access to females. They often guard tunnel entrances containing females and engage in fights with male competitors, relying on their body size and horn length to secure mating opportunities. In contrast, hornless males are believed to adopt nonaggressive sneaking behaviors when faced with physically superior horned males. A similar dimorphism in males have been found in some other species (Ageopsis nigicollis, Podischnus agenor). This behavior requires the beetle to be highly agile to reach and mate with females, all while avoiding detection by a guarding male. Additionally, smaller horned males compensate for their lack of horns by having larger testicles, which increases their chances of fertilizing a female. Moczek and Emlen (2000) suggest that possessing longer horns reduces male maneuverability inside tunnels, and is detrimental to sneaking behaviors. Therefore, having horns confers an advantage to males using aggressive behaviors to access females, while being hornless is favored in males who engage in sneaking behaviors.

Major males are often found to share parental provisioning responsibilities and brood ball making with females, sneaky minor males rarely do. Consequently, when there are more minor males in the population, major males would spend less of their time performing their parental duties, and more to mating and guarding the female.

Horns of Onthophagus taurus lack obvious homology to other insect traits. Hence, they are known as an evolutionary novelty, even by the term strictest definition. The evolution and diversification of horns of this species are rooted in an intricate patchwork of extrinsic and intrinsic mechanisms that involves parental effects, developmental plasticity, multiple internal pathways monitored by the doublesex (dsx) gene expression, the hedgehog gene expression as well as the insulin/insulin-growth factor (IGF) pathway, among numerous other elements.

A prominent feature of the mating system of O taurus is the competition for fertilization of females by males engaging in trials of strength over the possession of breeding tunnels. Ionizing radiation applied to O. taurus males induced mutations that reduced the expression of such strength-related precopulatory sexual traits. However, sexual selection by females for two generations was sufficient to remove such mutations from progeny.

=== Sexual selection in females ===
Female Onthophagus taurus also engage in competition among themselves for access to dung, which is a resource crucial for female reproduction. They use dung to create brood balls, which serve as food provisions for their offspring. Female O. taurus are unable to reproduce if they lack access to dung. There is evidence of intraspecific brood parasitism among females, which happens when members of the same species exploit another's parental care efforts, with females replacing the existing eggs of parents with their own. Female O. taurus beetles were observed to use brood balls created by other females as food provisions for their own offspring. The speed at which dung dries out seems to affect the likelihood of brood parasitism. Females provided with rapidly drying dung were significantly more likely to search and use brood balls made by other females of the same species. To prevent their brood balls from being stolen, females would spend hours refilling tunnels with soil or sand that had been excavated earlier. This behavior helps reduce the risk of parasitism by making it harder for other females to locate the brood balls underground.

== Agricultural importance ==
Dung beetles can contribute more nitrogen levels in the soil by burrowing manure into the ground to form their tunnels. Onthophagus taurus are known as tunnelers. They create tunnels beneath dung pats, where they deposit dung balls. This creates channels for water and air to move through. In doing so, they also improve the soil and help it absorb and retain more water, thus supporting healthier crop growth. Additionally, the mixing of soil and dung by tunneling beetles improves soil tilth, which refers to the soil's physical condition for plant growth. As they dig tunnels, these beetles also push soil up onto the dung pile, further aiding in the incorporation of organic matter into the soil, while increasing the recycling of nutrients back into the soil. Lastly digging these burrows increases soil permeability and lowers the risk of soil erosion and surface runoff. As a result, less nitrogen pollution would flood the farm fields due to the soil's increased capacity for water retention. This subsequently prevents the formation of dead zones caused by excess nitrogen runoff. Furthermore, dung beetles can play a critical role in disrupting the life cycle of dung-breeding flies. By collecting and disbursing feces underground, they eliminate the surface breeding habitat for these pests, preventing egg-laying and reproduction. This also reduces the attraction of other harmful pests like worms, thereby benefiting livestock and agricultural produce.

Dung beetles have been utilized in the breakdown of manure on sheep and dairy farms worldwide.

In September 2013 O. taurus was released for the first time in New Zealand, in the Gore District of Southland. These beetles pull the manure into the ground to create their brood balls, which they use as egg chambers.

This increases grazing space for cattle, reduces habitats for flies and bacteria, and reduces the need for chemical fertilizers.

== Additional notes ==
Onthophagus taurus has been measured pulling a weight of 1141 times its own body mass and is considered the strongest animal on earth relative to its size.
