= Diapterna hamata =

Scientific classification
- Kingdom: Animalia
- Phylum: Arthropoda
- Clade: Pancrustacea
- Class: Insecta
- Order: Coleoptera
- Suborder: Polyphaga
- Infraorder: Scarabaeiformia
- Family: Scarabaeidae
- Genus: Diapterna
- Species: D. hamata

Binomial name
- Diapterna hamata (Say, 1824)

Synonyms
- Aphodius hamatus Say, 1824; Aphodius garmani Brown, 1929; Aphodius occidentalis Horn, 1870

Species of beetle

Diapterna hamata is a species of aphodiine dung beetle in the family Scarabaeidae. It is found in Canada (Alberta, British Columbia, Manitoba, Ontario, Quebec, Saskatchewan) and the United States (California, Idaho, Indiana, Michigan, Montana, North Dakota, Oregon, Washington, Wyoming).

== Description ==
Adults reach a length of about 6–8 mm (0.24–0.31 in). They have a rather short, convex, nearly dull, glabrous, blackish body. The elytra have a brownish discal spot and the base, apex and striae are yellowish.
