= Marie Dacke =

Swedish biologist (born 1973)

- Born: 1973 (age 52–53)
- Education: Lund University
- Television: Studio Natur
- Awards: Ig Nobel Prize, Forskar Grand Prix

Marie Ann-Charlotte Dacke is a professor of Sensory Biology at the Lund Vision Group in Lund University, Lund, Sweden. Her research focuses on nocturnal and diurnal compass systems, using the dung beetle as a model organism. Dacke is a Wallenberg Scholar as of 2025. In 2022, she was elected a fellow of the Royal Swedish Academy of Sciences. Dacke has an interest in public science education, and is a panel member of the Swedish TV show Studio Natur. In 2013, she received an Ig Nobel Prize for her work on the navigation system of dung beetles. Since 2018, she is also an honorary professor at the University of the Witwatersrand in Johannesburg, South Africa.

== Early life and career ==
Dacke went to high school in Landskrona. After graduating from high school she attended Lund University, where she studied biology. Here, she completed her Ph.D. on Celestial Orientation in Dim Light in 2003, under the supervision of Professor Dan-Eric Nilsson. Her thesis focused on how optical compasses are built, how they are used and how they are adapted to work at low light intensities. During her Ph.D, she discovered a unique compass organ in spiders, a study which was published in Nature in 1999. A few years later she revealed the first evidence of an animal able to use the dim pattern of polarized moon-light for orientation, a study also published in Nature in 2003.

After her Ph.D., she spent two years as a postdoctoral researcher at the Centre for Visual Sciences at the Australian National University in Canberra. In 2007, she returned to Lund University as a research fellow and in 2011 she became an associate professor in Sensory Biology. She became a Professor in Sensory Biology in 2017.

Dacke's research focuses on navigation and orientation in insects, in particular orientation in dung beetles. She is interested in the celestial compass (which is the use of the sky to guide navigation). By exploring the interface between behaviour, neurobiology and cognition, her research tries to understand how diurnal and nocturnal compass systems of insects work. In 2013, she, together with Marcus Byrne, Emily Baird, Clark Scholtz and Eric Warrant, received the Ig Nobel Prize in the joint astronomy and biology category for showing that nocturnal dung beetles can use the Milky Way as a compass. This research was published in Current Biology. In 2014, Dacke received an Excellent Young Researchers grant from the Swedish Research Council to continue her research on the compass systems of dung beetles, exploring the link between electrophysiology and behaviour. Part of this research was published in Proceedings of the National Academy of Sciences (PNAS) in 2015 and Current Biology in 2016.

In 2018, Dacke received funding from the European Research Council to expand her work, and define the principles behind multimodal navigational systems, studying brain activity in dung beetles as they perform their orientation behaviour. Part of this cross-disciplinary research was published in PNAS in 2019 and iScience in 2022.

Dacke has been elected a fellow of the Young Academy of Sweden (2011), Royal Physiographic Society of Lund (2017), Royal Entomological Society of London (2018), Royal Swedish Academy of Sciences (2022) and Societas Ad Sciendum (2023). Since 2025 she has been a Wallenberg Scholar.

== Science communication ==
Dacke has been a panel member on the Swedish TV show Studio Natur (currently streaming on SVT Play) since 2010.

In 2012, Dacke was named best science communicator in Sweden in the national competition Forskar Grand Prix (Science Grand Prix).

In 2012, Dacke was one of the scientists to appear in a series about research and researchers produced by the Swedish Foundation for Strategic Research and TV4.

In 2019, she gave the Royal Entomological Society's Verrall Lecture at the Natural History Museum, London, speaking about As the crow flies, and the beetle rolls: straight-line orientation from behaviour to neurons.

Dacke has authored two books; Trädgårdsdjur – myllret och mångfalden som växterna älskar (Roos & Tegnér, ISBN 9789188953629) (co-authored with Låtta Skogh) in 2020, and Taggad att leva – igelkottens liv, historiska resa och hotande framtid (Roos & Tegnér, ISBN 9789189215368), in 2021.
