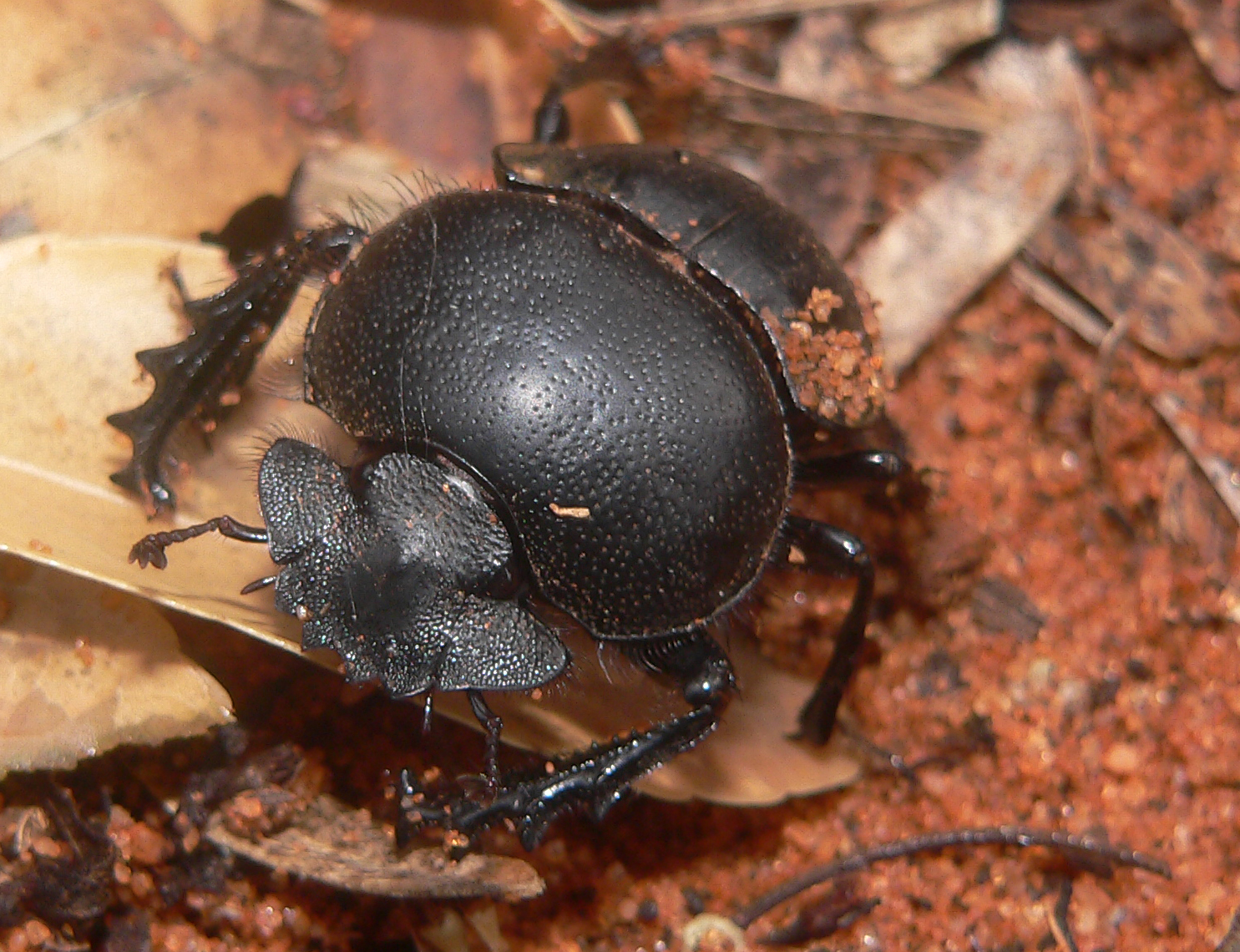
- Scarabaeus viettei (syn. Madateuchus viettei, Scarabaeidae) in dry spiny forest close to Mangily, western Madagascar

Scientific classification
- Kingdom: Animalia
- Phylum: Arthropoda
- Clade: Pancrustacea
- Class: Insecta
- Order: Coleoptera
- Suborder: Polyphaga
- Infraorder: Scarabaeiformia
- Superfamily: Scarabaeoidea

Groups included
- Geotrupidae; Scarabaeinae; Aphodiinae

Cladistically included but traditionally excluded taxa
- Termitoderini

= Dung beetle =

Informal group of insects

Dung beetles are beetles that feed on feces. All species of dung beetle belong to the superfamily Scarabaeoidea, most of them to the subfamilies Scarabaeinae and Aphodiinae of the family Scarabaeidae (scarab beetles). As most species of Scarabaeinae feed exclusively on feces, that subfamily is often dubbed true dung beetles. There are dung-feeding beetles which belong to other families, such as the Geotrupidae (the earth-boring dung beetle). The Scarabaeinae alone comprises more than 5,000 species.

As they do not belong to a single group sharing a common ancestor, there is a diversity in the behavior of dung beetles, including the iconic dung-rolling behavior revered by Ancient Egyptians as the god Khepri rolling the sun across the sky.

== Evolution ==
Dung beetles are not a single taxonomic group or clade (they are not monophyletic); dung feeding is found in several families of beetles, so the behaviour cannot be assumed to have evolved only once. The taxa considered to be dung beetles are within the Scarabaeoidea:

- Coleoptera (order), beetles
  - Scarabaeoidea (superfamily), scarabs (most families in the group do not use dung)
    - Geotrupidae (family), "earth-boring dung beetles"
    - Scarabaeidae (family), "scarab beetles" (not all species use dung)
      - Scarabaeinae (subfamily), "true dung beetles"
      - Aphodiinae (subfamily), "small dung beetles" (not all species use dung)

== Ecology and behavior ==
Dung beetle rolling a ball of dung in the Addo Elephant National Park, South Africa

Dung beetles live in many habitats, including desert, grasslands and savannas, farmlands, and native and planted forests. They are highly influenced by the environmental context, and do not prefer extremely cold or dry weather. They are found on all continents except Antarctica. They eat the dung of herbivores and omnivores, and prefer that produced by the latter. Many of them also feed on mushrooms and decaying leaves and fruits. The Neotropical Deltochilum valgum, D. kolbei and D. viridescens are carnivores with a strong preference for preying upon millipedes. Two other species from Brazil, Canthon dives and Canthon virens, prey on queens and other winged forms of leafcutter ants. One species from the Iberian Peninsula, Thorectes lusitanicus, feeds on acorns.

The behavior of the beetles was poorly understood until the studies of Jean Henri Fabre in the late 19th century. For example, Fabre corrected the myth that a dung beetle would seek aid from other dung beetles when confronted by obstacles. By observation and experiment, he found the seeming helpers were in fact awaiting an opportunity to steal the roller's food source.

In 1991, Ilkka Cambefort and Yves Hanski classified dung beetles into three functional types based on their feeding and nesting strategies: Rollers, Tunnelers, and Dwellers. The "rollers" roll and bury a dung ball either for food storage or for making a brooding ball. When brooding, two beetles, one male and one female, stay around the dung ball during the rolling process. Usually it is the male that rolls the ball, while the female hitch-hikes or simply follows behind. In some cases, the male and the female roll together. When a spot with soft soil is found, they stop and bury the ball, then mate underground. After the mating, one or both of them prepares the brooding ball. When the ball is finished, the female lays eggs inside it, a form of mass provisioning. Some species remain to guard their offspring after laying. The dung beetle goes through a complete metamorphosis. The larvae live in brood balls made with dung prepared by their parents. During the larval stage, the beetle feeds on the dung surrounding it. Tunnelers such as Euoniticellus intermedius bury the dung wherever they find it. Dwellers neither roll nor burrow: they simply live within dung.

Most dung beetles search for dung using their sensitive sense of smell. Some smaller species simply attach themselves to the dung-producing animals to wait for dung. After capturing the dung, a dung beetle rolls it, following a straight line despite all obstacles. Sometimes, dung beetles try to steal the dung ball from another beetle, so the dung beetles have to move rapidly away from a dung pile once they have rolled their ball to prevent it from being stolen. The strength of dung beetles is well-known; male Onthophagus taurus can pull 1,141 times their own body weight, the equivalent of an average person pulling six double-decker buses full of people. The daily dung of one elephant can support 2,000,000 beetles. Some species of dung beetles can bury dung 250 times their own mass in one night.

The nocturnal African dung beetle Scarabaeus satyrus is one of the few known invertebrate animals that navigate and orient themselves using the Milky Way. The African Scarabaeus zambesianus navigates by polarization patterns in moonlight, the first animal known to do so. Dung beetles can also navigate when only the Milky Way or clusters of bright stars are visible, making them the only insects known to orient themselves by the Milky Way. Research using 1 kg boluses of elephant dung found that a larger number exploit it during the night (13,700) than during the day (3,330). The eyes of dung beetles are superposition compound eyes typical of many scarabaeid beetles;

A beetle rolling a dung ball and orienting itself

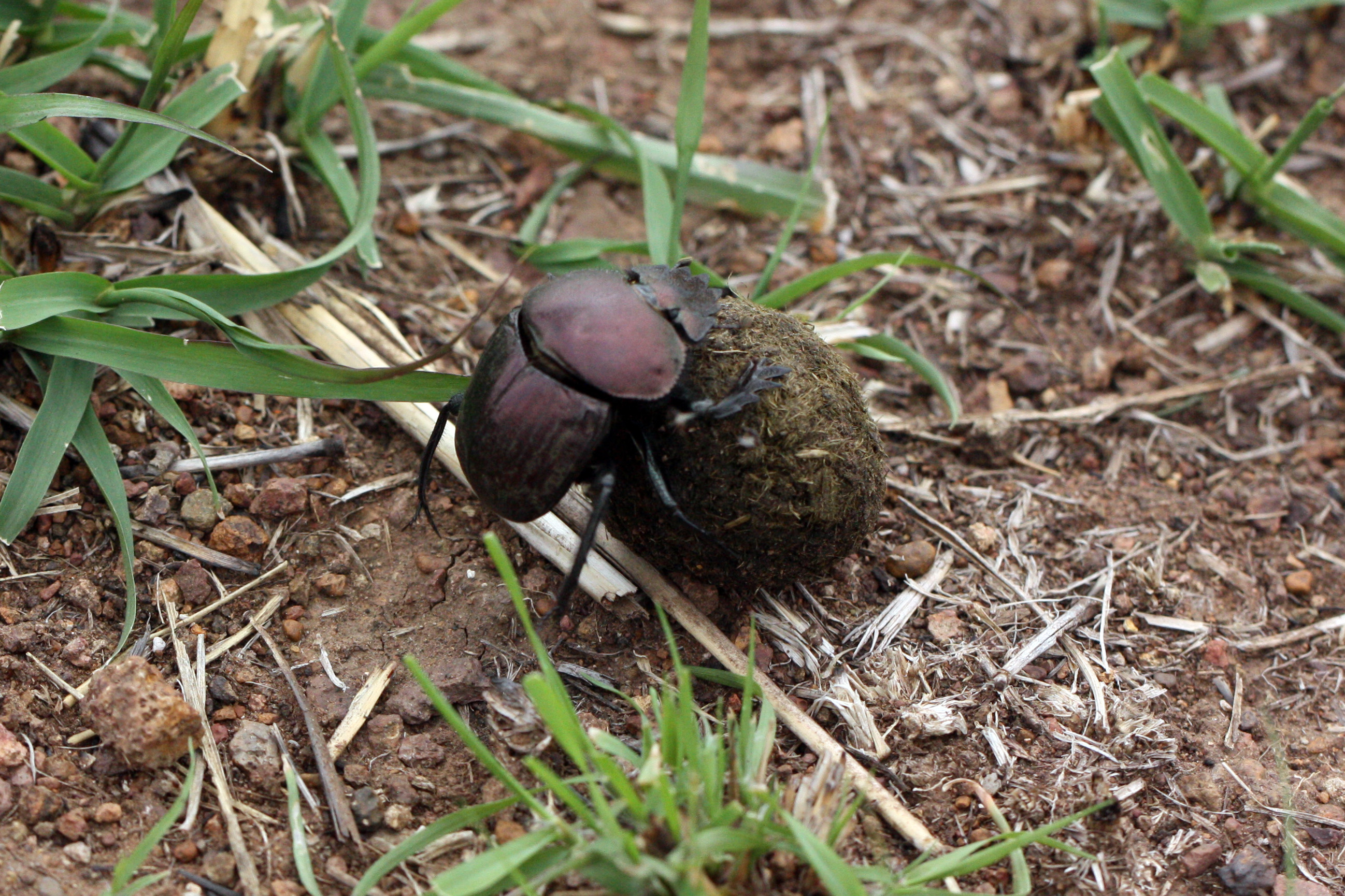
The beetle climbs onto the ball.

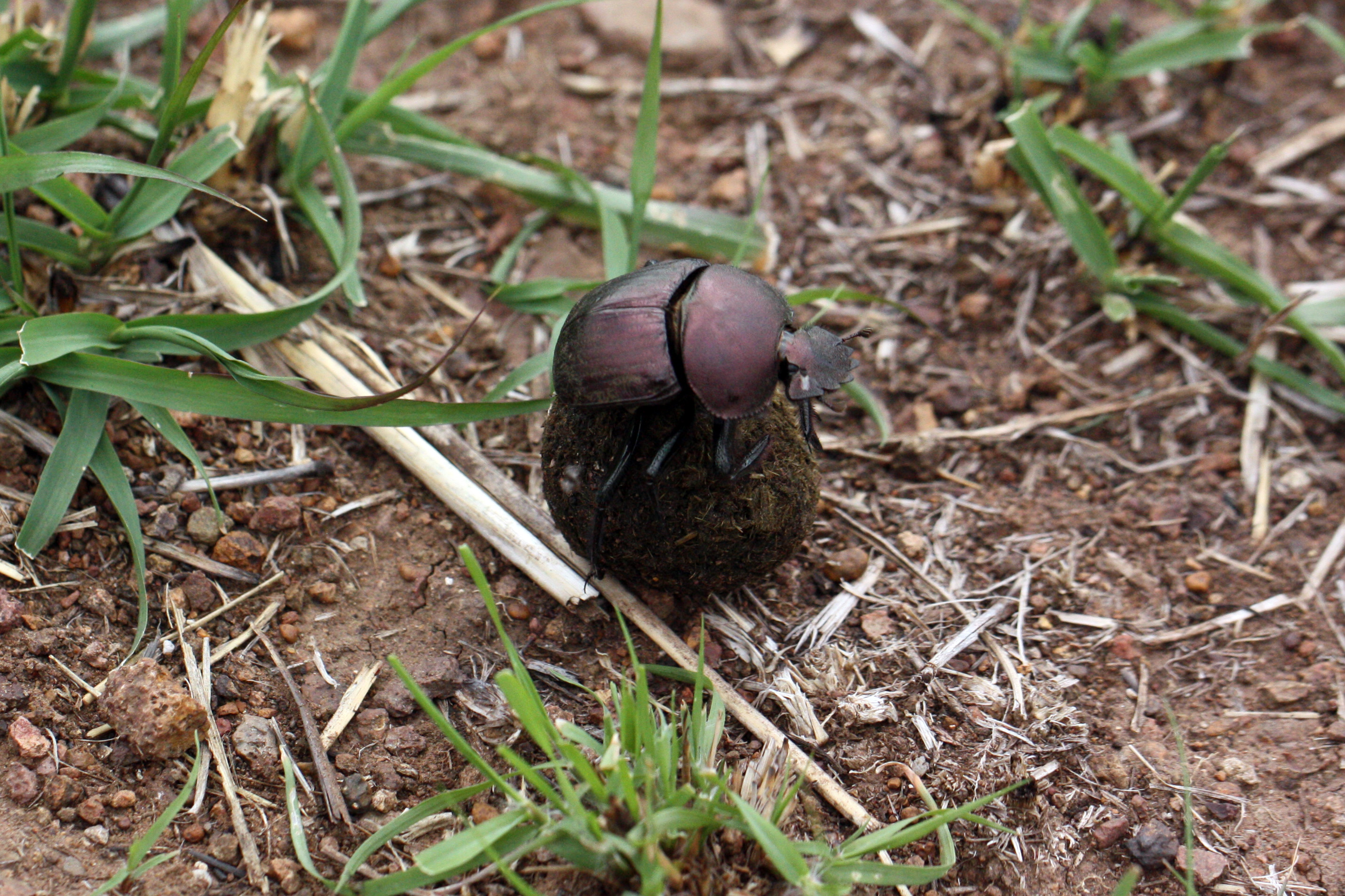
The beetle starts to turn around.

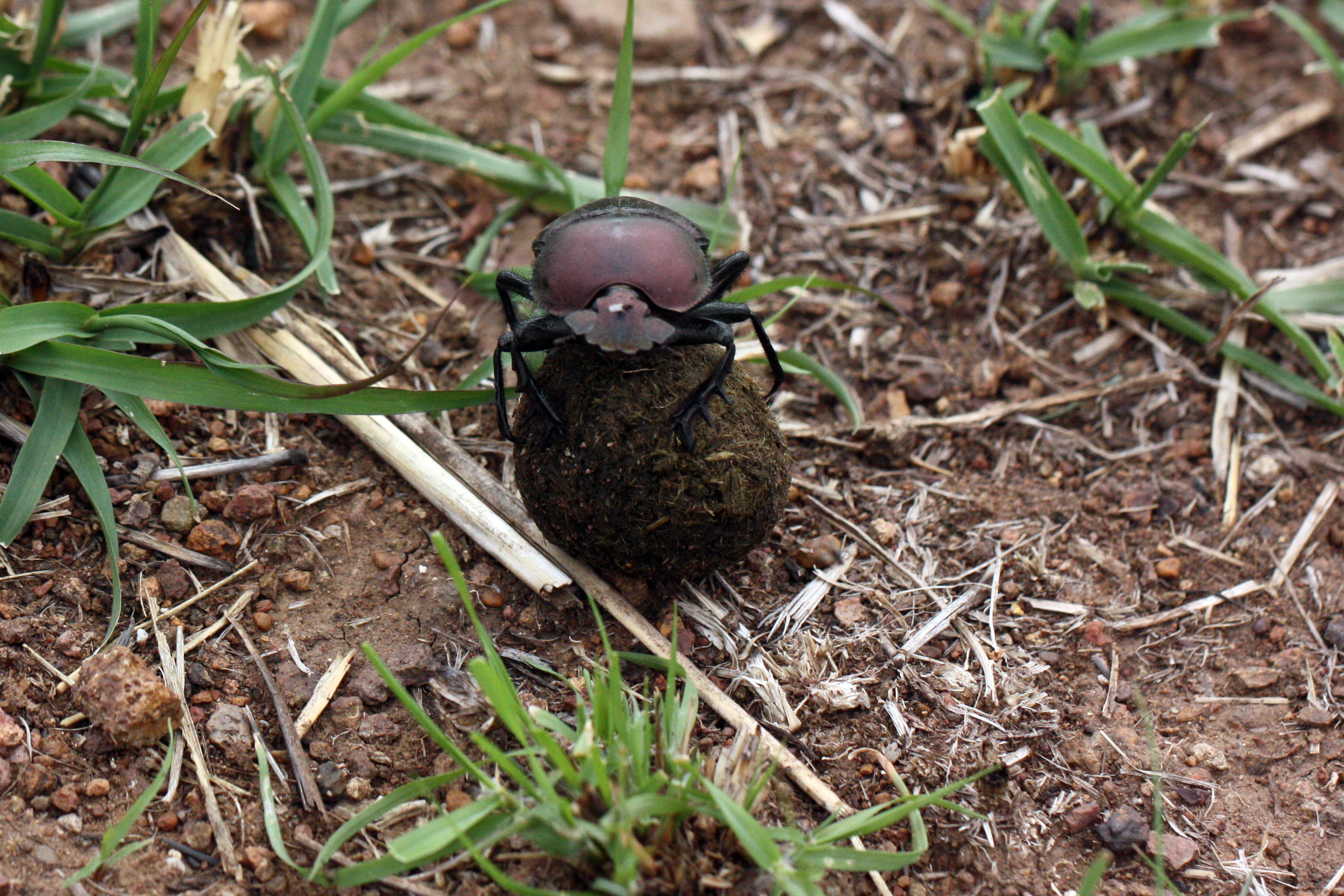
The beetle continues turning around.

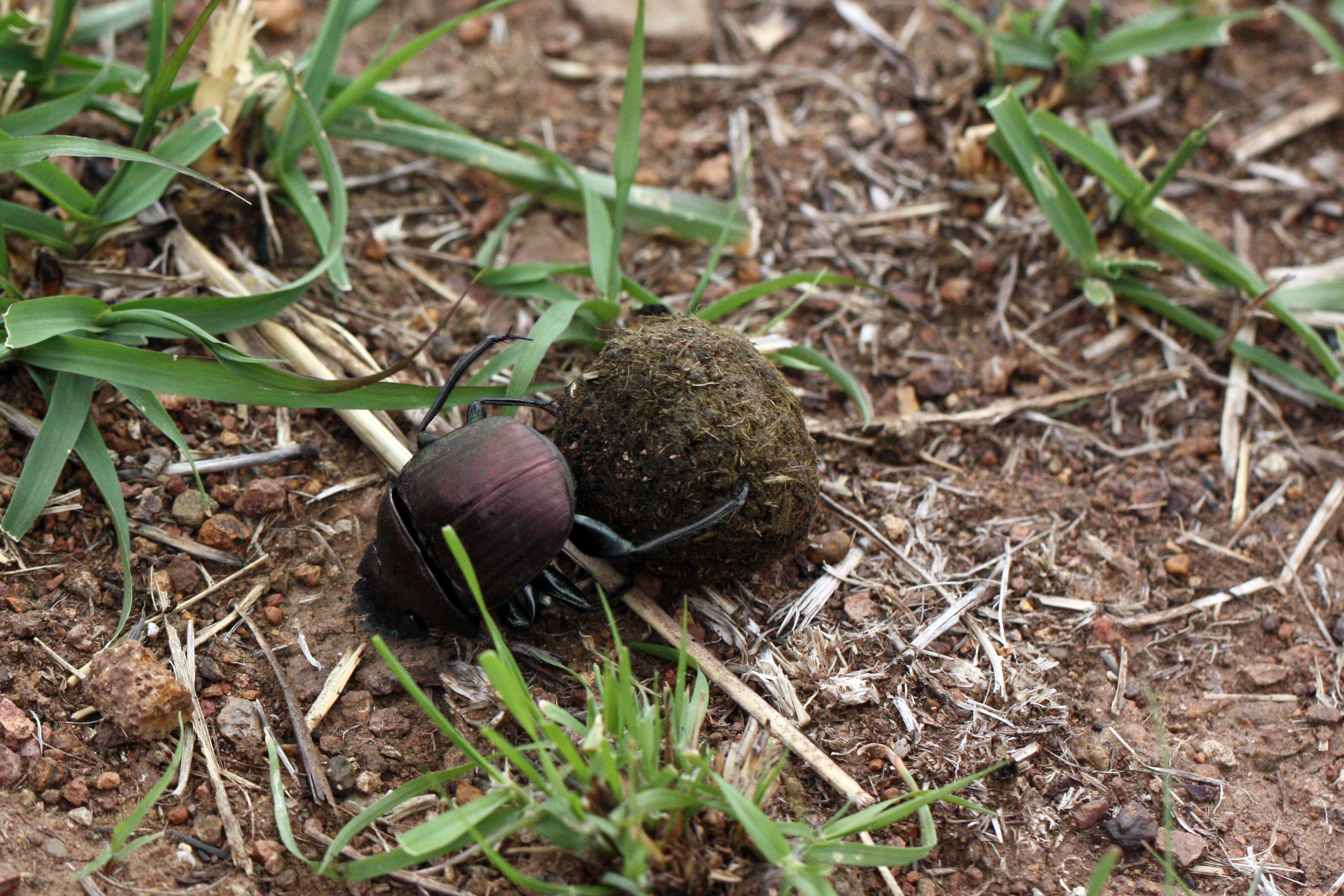
The beetle rolls the ball with its hind legs.

They are widely used in ecological research as a good bioindicator group to examine the impacts of climate disturbances, such as extreme droughts and associated fires, and human activities on tropical biodiversity and ecosystem functioning, such as seed dispersal, soil bioturbation and nutrient cycling.

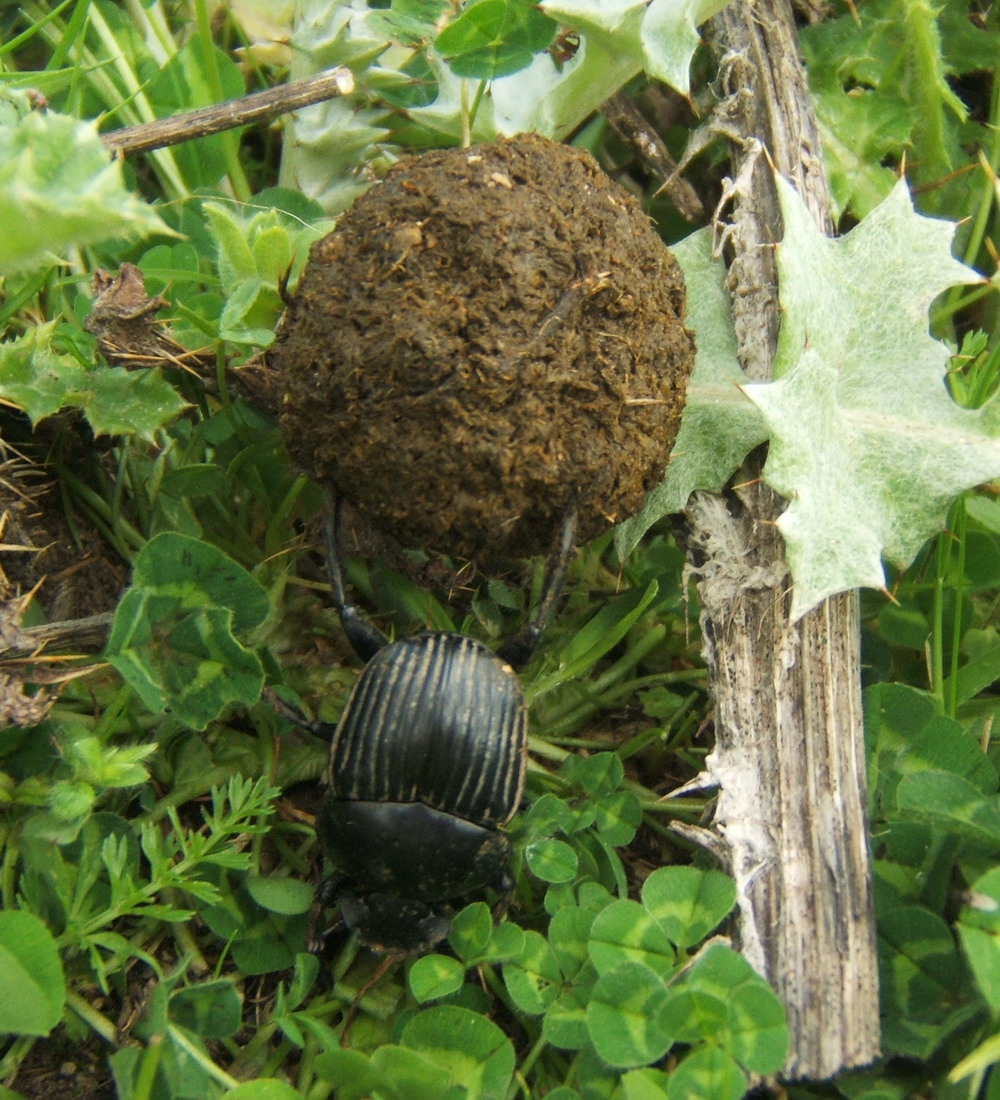
An earth-boring dung beetle at work

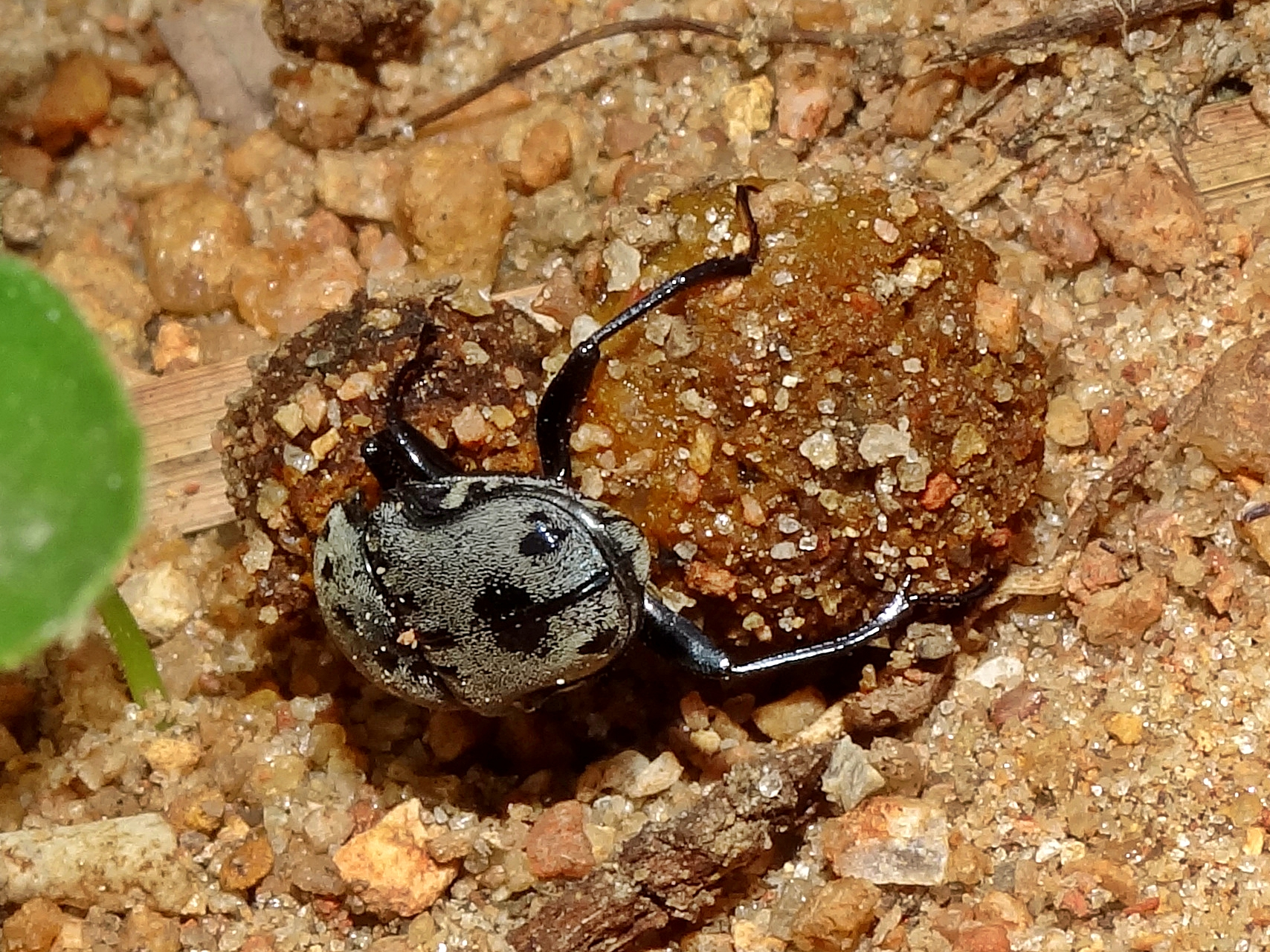
A dung beetle with two balls of dung

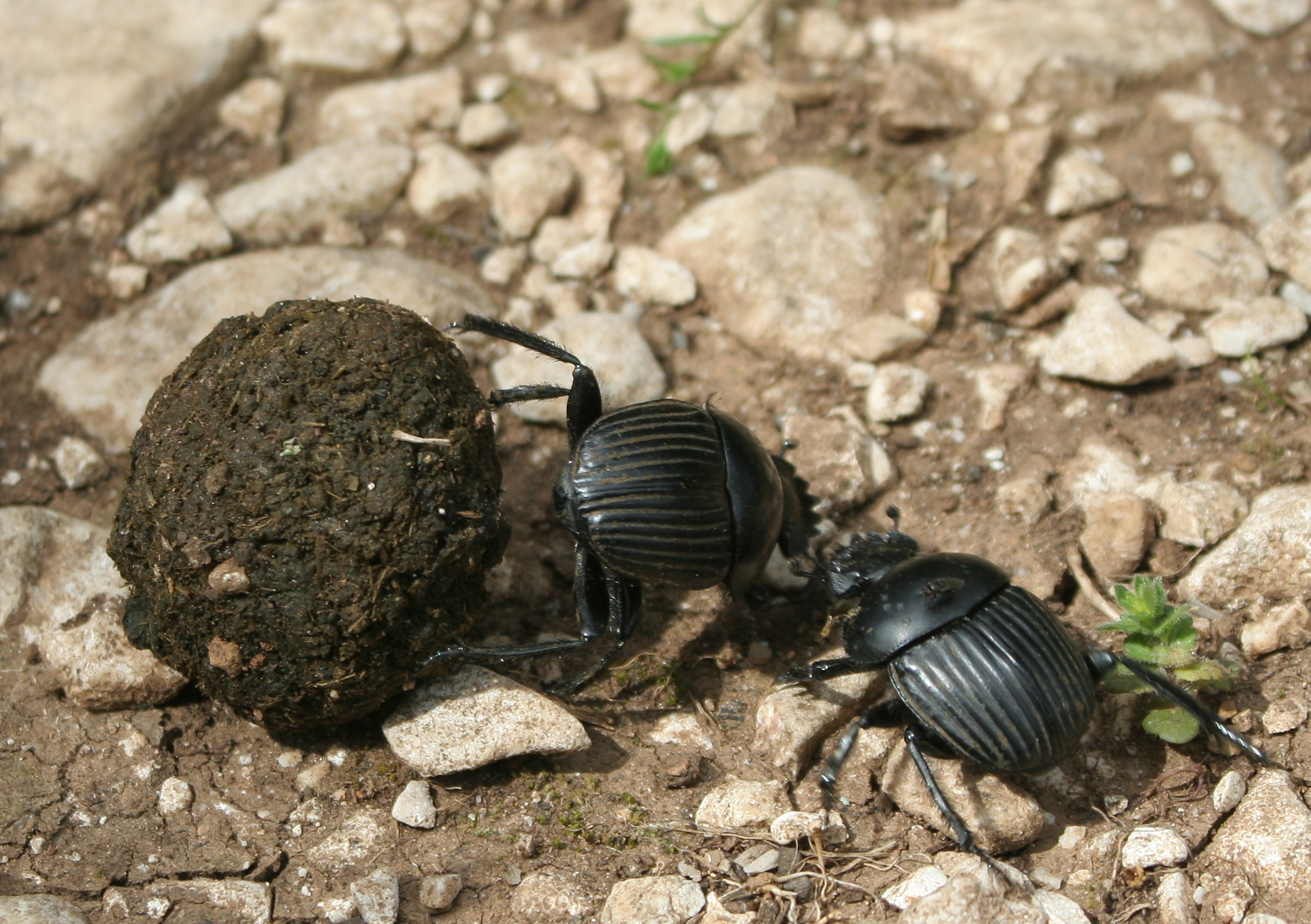
Two dung beetles fighting over a ball of dung

== Relation to humans ==
=== Agriculture ===
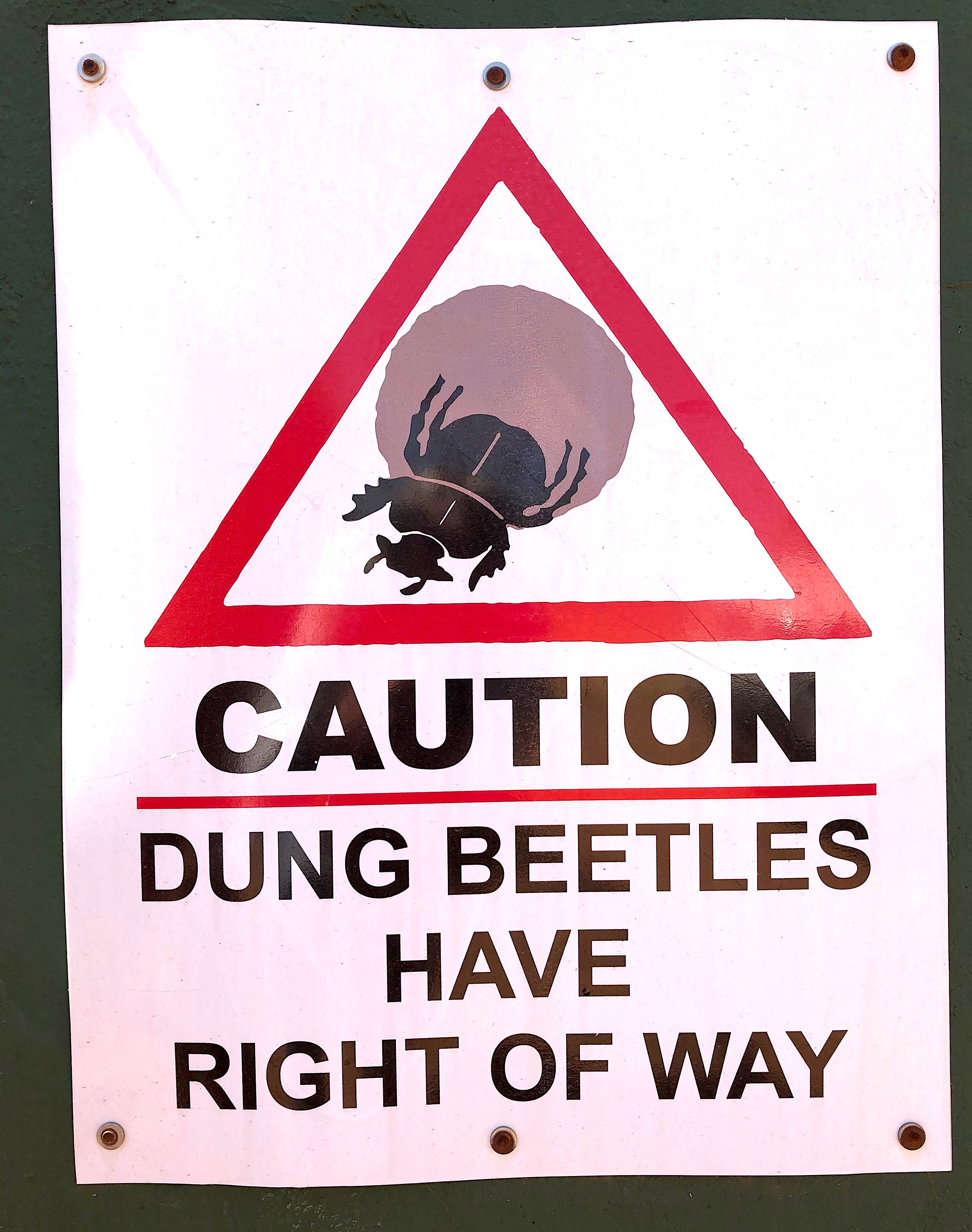
Caution sign showing the importance of dung beetles in South Africa

Dung beetles play a role in agriculture and tropical forests. By burying and consuming dung, they improve nutrient recycling and soil structure. Dung beetles have been further shown to improve soil conditions and plant growth on rehabilitated coal mines in South Africa. They are also important for the dispersal of seeds present in animals' dung, influencing seed burial and seedling recruitment in tropical forests. They can protect livestock, such as cattle, by removing the dung which, if left, could provide habitat for pests such as flies. Therefore, many countries have introduced the creatures for the benefit of animal husbandry. The American Institute of Biological Sciences reports that dung beetles save the United States cattle industry an estimated US$380 million annually through burying above-ground livestock dung.

In Australia, the Commonwealth Scientific and Industrial Research Organisation (CSIRO) commissioned the Australian Dung Beetle Project (1965–1985) which, led by George Bornemissza, sought to introduce species of dung beetles from South Africa and Europe. The successful introduction of 23 species was made, most notably Digitonthophagus gazella and Euoniticellus intermedius, which has resulted in improvement of the quality and fertility of Australian cattle pastures, along with a reduction in the population of pestilent Australian bush flies by around 90%. In 1995 it was reported that dung beetles were being trialled in the Sydney beach suburb of Curl Curl to deal with dog droppings.

An application made by Landcare Research to import up to 11 species of dung beetle into New Zealand was approved in 2011. As well as improving pasture soils the Dung Beetle Release Strategy Group said that it would result in a reduction in emissions of nitrous oxide (a greenhouse gas) from agriculture. There was, however, strong opposition from some at the University of Auckland, and a few others, based on the risks of the dung beetles acting as vectors of disease. Several Landcare programmes in Australia involved schoolchildren collecting dung beetles.

The African dung beetle (D. gazella) was introduced in several locations in North and South America and has been spreading its distribution to other regions by natural dispersal and accidental transportation, and is now probably naturalized in most countries between Mexico and Argentina. The exotic species might be useful for controlling diseases of livestock in commercial areas, and might displace native species in modified landscapes; however, data is not conclusive about its effect on native species in natural environments and further monitoring is required.

The Mediterranean dung beetle (Bubas bison) has been used in conjunction with biochar stock fodder to reduce emissions of nitrous oxide and carbon dioxide, which are both greenhouse gases. The beetles work the biochar-enriched dung into the soil without the use of machines.

Dung beetles (Scarabaeids), specifically Onthophagus australis Guérin-Méneville, improve plant yields using their dung. Japanese millet was studied and nutrient uptake was measured. The plants were placed in pots lacking nitrogen, phosphorus, and sulfur. Cow-dung was then added in treatment groups with or without O. australis. Top growth and roots significantly increased when the dung was mixed well into the soil in the pots; dung beetle activity greatly improved plant life.

=== In culture ===
==== Ancient Egypt ====
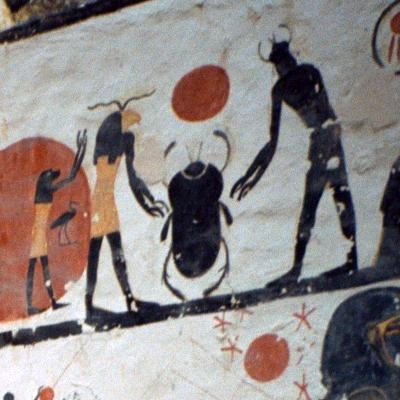
A scarab, depicted on the walls of Tomb KV6 in the Valley of the Kings

Several species of the dung beetle, most notably the species Scarabaeus sacer (the sacred scarab), enjoyed a sacred status among the ancient Egyptians. The scarab was linked to Khepri ("he who has come into being"), the god of the rising sun. The ancients believed that the dung beetle was only male-sexed, and reproduced by depositing semen into a dung ball. The supposed self-creation of the beetle resembles that of Khepri, who creates himself out of nothing. Moreover, the dung ball rolled by a dung beetle resembles the sun. Plutarch described the process.

One scholar comments on traits of the scarab connected with the theme of death and rebirth:

It may not have gone unnoticed that the pupa, whose wings and legs are encased at this stage of development, is very mummy-like. It has even been pointed out that the egg-bearing ball of dung is created in an underground chamber which is reached by a vertical shaft and horizontal passage curiously reminiscent of Old Kingdom mastaba tombs."

=== As food and folk medicine ===
Some dung beetles are used as food in South East Asia and a variety of dung beetle species have been used therapeutically (and are still being used in traditionally living societies) in potions and folk medicines to treat a number of illnesses and disorders.

=== In literature ===
Aesop's fable "The Eagle and the Beetle", tells of a feud between the very different animals.

Hans Christian Andersen's "The Dung Beetle" tells the story of a dung beetle who lives in the stable of the king's horses in an imaginary kingdom. When he demands golden shoes like those the king's horse wears and is refused, he flies away and has a series of adventures, which are often precipitated by his feeling of superiority to other animals. He finally returns to the stable having decided (against all logic) that it is for him that the king's horse wears golden shoes.

== See also ==
- Catharsius, a dung beetle genus in Africa and Asia
- Addo Elephant National Park, site of the largest remaining population of the endangered flightless dung beetle (Circellium bacchus)
- List of dung beetle and chafer (Scarabaeoidea) species recorded in Britain
- Rotating locomotion in living systems

== Bibliography ==
- Tills, Tony (2013), Science Year, World Book, Inc., ISBN 978-0-7166-0567-6
